= Natura non facit saltus =

Latin axiom in natural philosophy

Natura non facit saltus (Latin for "nature does not make jumps") has been an important principle of natural philosophy. It appears as an axiom in the works of Gottfried Leibniz (New Essays, IV, 16: "la nature ne fait jamais des sauts", "nature never makes jumps"), one of the inventors of the infinitesimal calculus (see Law of Continuity). It is also an essential element of Charles Darwin's treatment of natural selection in his Origin of Species. The Latin translation comes from Linnaeus' Philosophia Botanica.

== Overview ==
The principle expresses the idea that natural things and properties change gradually, rather than suddenly. In a mathematical context, this allows one to assume that the solutions of the governing equations are continuous, and also does not preclude their being differentiable (differentiability implies continuity). Modern day quantum mechanics is sometimes seen as violating the principle, with its idea of discrete transitions between energy states. Erwin Schrödinger in his objections to quantum jumps supported the principle, and initially developed his wave mechanics in order to remove these jumps.

In the biological context, the principle was used by Charles Darwin and others to defend the evolutionary postulate that all species develop from earlier species through gradual and minute changes rather than through the sudden emergence of new forms. In botany in particular, Antoine-Laurent de Jussieu was a major proponent of this view as well. Modern evolutionary biology has terminology suggesting both continuous change, such as genetic drift, and discontinuous variation, such as mutation. However, as the basic structure of DNA is discrete, nature is now widely understood to make jumps at the biological level, if only on a very small scale.

== Variant forms ==
The principle is also variously referred to as:

- Natura in operationibus suis non facit saltum (transl.: "Nature in its operations doesn't make a (any) jump") — 1613 appearance of a similar expression.
- Natura non faciat saltus, nec ab extremo ad extremum transeat nisi per medium (transl.: "Nature may not make jumps, nor may it pass from extreme to extreme except by way of a mean.") — John Ray (1682).
- Natura non saltum facit (literally, "Nature does not make a jump") is a variant form, sometimes attributed to Gottfried Leibniz. Natura non facit saltum is also the epigraph of Alfred Marshall's 1890 Principles of Economics. He most likely borrowed the phrase from Darwin's The Origin of Species. An admirer of Herbert Spencer, Marshall intended the epigraph both to proclaim his adherence to evolutionary thought and to justify his use of differential calculus as an analytical tool—a use seen in all the seminal thinkers of neoclassical economics. The spelling variation (saltus vs. saltum) displays a mere numerical difference: the Latin noun saltus, meaning "leap", belongs to the 4th declension, so its singular accusative is saltum (leap), while the plural is saltus (leaps).
- Die Natur macht keine Sprünge — German translation of the phrase.

== See also ==
- In biology
  - Anagenesis
  - Cladogenesis
  - Phyletic gradualism
  - Punctuated equilibrium
  - Punctuated gradualism
  - Quantum evolution
  - Saltation (biology)
  - Stephen Jay Gould
- Continuous variation
- Continuum mechanics
- Mathematical concepts of "not making jumps":
  - Continuous function
  - Differentiable function
  - Discontinuity
  - Discrete mathematics vs mathematical analysis
  - Smooth function
- Digital physics
- Weyl's tile argument
