= Bartholomew Des Bosses =

Jesuit theologian and philosopher (1668–1738)

Bartholomew Des Bosses (29 August 1668, Chaineux; 17 April 1738, Cologne) was a Jesuit theologian and philosopher, known mainly for his voluminous correspondence with Leibniz.

== Biography ==
Des Bosses joined the Society of Jesus in 1686. In 1700, he taught at the Jesuit college in Emmerich, later moving to Hildesheim. He remained there until moving in 1710 to Cologne, taking up an appointment as professor of mathematics (and later moral philosophy) at the Jesuit college there. Apart from a stay in Paderborn in 1712 and 1713, he remained in Cologne for the rest of his life.

Des Bosses met Leibniz sometime in 1705 and agreed to translate his Theodicee into Latin. Their correspondence continued until Leibniz's death in 1716. The letters contained a tentative elaboration of a new feature of Leibniz's philosophy known as the vinculum subtantiale (substantial bond).
