= Jakob Thomasius =

German philosopher (1622–1684)

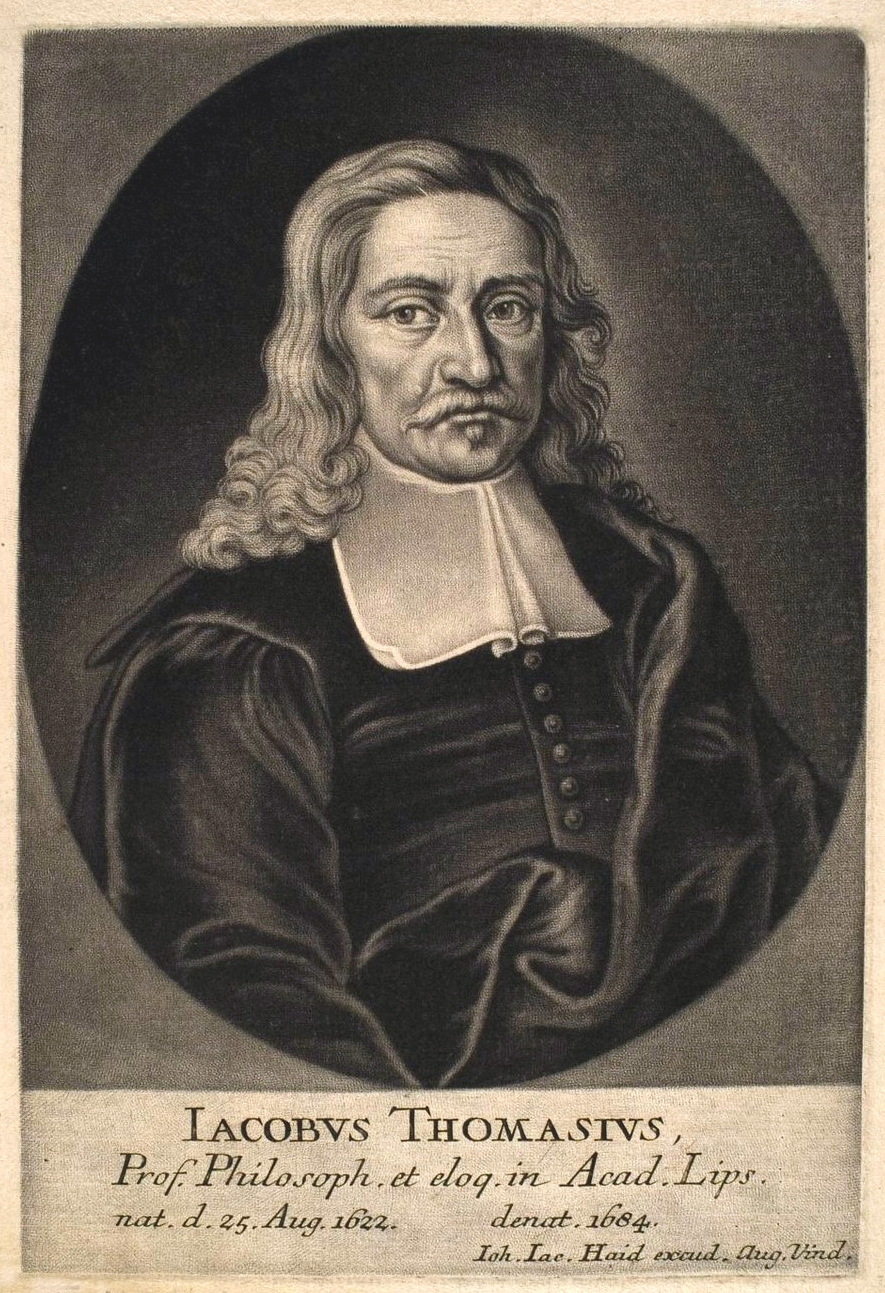
- Jakob Thomasius (1622–1684)
- Born: 27 August 1622; Leipzig, Electorate of Saxony
- Died: 9 September 1684 (aged 62); Leipzig, Electorate of Saxony
- Education: University of Leipzig (B.A., 1642; M.A., 1643)
- Scientific career
- Fields: Philosopher
- Institutions: University of Leipzig
- Academic advisors: Friedrich Leibniz
- Doctoral students: Otto Mencke
- Other notable students: Gottfried Leibniz

Notes
- He was the father of Christian Thomasius and the brother of Johann Thomasius.

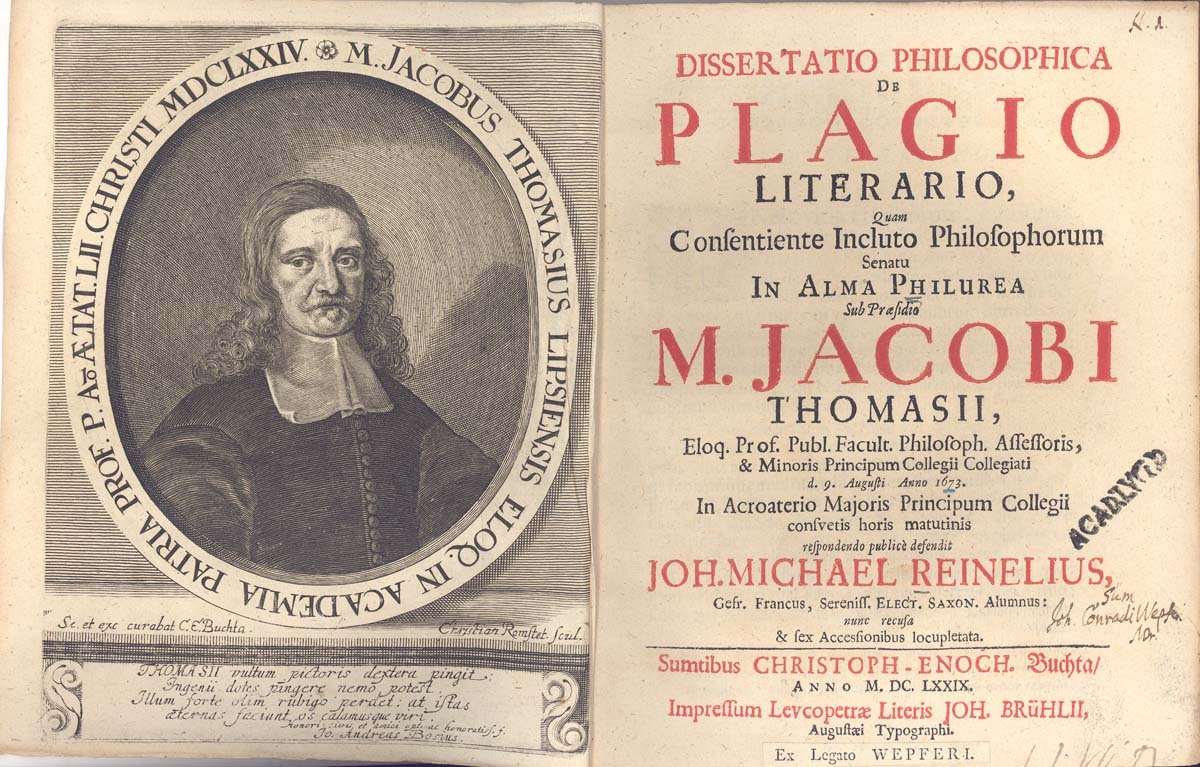
Dissertation about plagiarism at Leipzig University (1679) with Thomasius as praeses

Jakob Thomasius (/toʊˈmeɪʃəs/; German: [toˈmaːzi̯ʊs]; Latin: Jacobus Thomasius; 27 August 1622 – 9 September 1684) was a German philosopher and jurist. From 1670 to 1676, he was rector of the Old St Nicholas School in Leipzig. He is now regarded as an important founding figure in the scholarly study of the history of philosophy. His views were eclectic, and were taken up by his son Christian Thomasius.

== Work ==
Thomasius was influential in the contemporary realignment of philosophy as a discipline. Martin Mulsow writes:

According to Thomasius’ “Schediasma historicum” of 1665, from a theological point of view, philosophy needed to guarantee a clear separation of Creator from Creation, of God from Nature. It should thus only spring from Christian Aristotelianism, not from Stoicism or Neoplatonism.

He wrote on a wide range of topics, including Gnosticism, plagiarism and the education of women.

He was the teacher of Gottfried Leibniz at the University of Leipzig, where Thomasius was professor of Rhetoric and Moral Philosophy, remaining a friend and correspondent up until the early 1670s, and has been described as Leibniz's mentor.

He is perhaps best remembered now as the author of the first published attack on Spinoza's Theological-Political Treatise. In the academic study of Western esotericism, Thomasius is accredited as an intellectual watershed leading to the demise of the previously hegemonic prisca theologia.

== Family ==
From 1653, Jacob Thomasius was married to Maria Weber, daughter of Archdeacon of St. Nicholas's Church and the extraordinary professor of the university Jeremiah Weber. Their children were the famous philosopher and lawyer Christian Thomasius (1655–1728), Doctor of medicine and physician in Nuremberg Gottfried Thomasius (born 1660) and Johanna (born 1663) – later the wife of professor of poetry and director of the University library in Leipzig Joachim Feller (1638–1691). Since Maria Weber died a few days after giving birth to her daughter, in 1664 Jacob Thomasius remarried with the widow of the rector of St. Peter's School. Nicholas was born Maria Elisabeth Hornschuh, nee Eichhorn, which brought him six more daughters and one son; among them, Maria Elisabeth (born 1665), was the wife of Leipzig professor of theology Adam Rechenberg (1642–1721).

== Bibliography ==
- Philosophia practica (1661)
- Schediasma historicum (1665)
- De foeminarum eruditione (1671) with Johannes Sauerbrei and Jacobus Smalcius
- Praefationes sub auspicia disputationum suarum (1681)
- Dissertationes ad stoicae philosophiae (1682)
- Orationes (1683)
