= Friedrich Leibniz =

German philosopher (1597–1652)

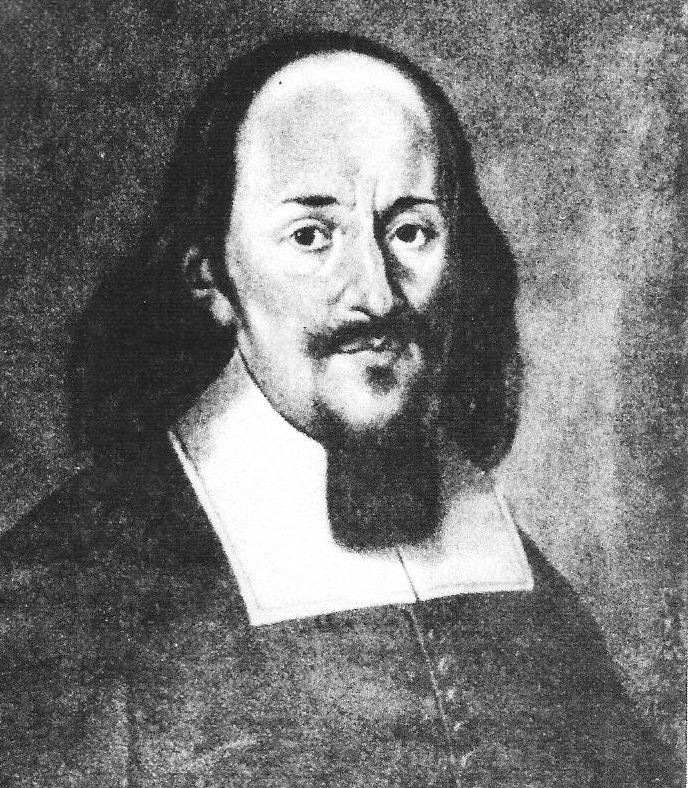
- Born: 1597; Altenberg, Ernestine duchies, Holy Roman Empire
- Died: 1652 (aged 54–55); Leipzig, Electorate of Saxony, Holy Roman Empire
- Education: University of Leipzig (M.A., 1622)
- Spouse(s): Anna Fritzsche, Dorothea Voigt, Catharina Schmuck
- Children: 8, including Gottfried Leibniz
- Scientific career
- Fields: Moral philosophy
- Workplaces: University of Leipzig
- Notable students: Jakob Thomasius

Friedrich Leibniz (or Leibnütz; 1597–1652) was a Lutheran lawyer and a notary, registrar and professor of moral philosophy within Leipzig University, where he also served as Dean of Philosophy. He was the father of Gottfried Leibniz.

== Biography ==
Leibniz was born in Altenberg, Saxony, the son of Ambrosious Leibniz, a civil servant, and a Leipzig noblewoman named Anna Deuerlin.

He completed his master's degree at the University of Leipzig during 1622 and became an actuary in administration at the university. His first marriage in 1625 produced a son, Johann Friedrich, and a daughter, Anna Rosina. He was elected to the chair in moral philosophy at Leipzig in 1640. A childless marriage to a second wife ended with her death 1643. A subsequent 1644 marriage to Catharina Schmuck, a daughter of a well known lawyer (or professor of law) produced a son, the polymath Gottfried Wilhelm Leibniz.

21. Juny am Sontag 1646 Ist mein Sohn Gottfried Wilhelm, post sextam vespertinam 1/4 uff 7 uhr abents zur welt gebohren, im Wassermann.

During 1646 Leibniz was vice chairman of the faculty of philosophy and also was Professor of Moral Philosophy at the University of Leipzig, in addition to employment as actuary. He possessed a collection of books of ancient source. He died in Leipzig.

Eric John Aiton considers Friedrich Leibniz

... a competent though not original scholar, who devoted his time to his offices and to his family as a pious, Christian father.

On the other hand, in an address he delivered in 1646, Friedrich equated Apollo, the Greek god of knowledge, with Lucifer the christian devil, and introduced other variants in Biblical and Greek myths, notably the view of Eve as the she-Python slaughtered by Apollo-Lucifer. Friedrich Leibniz is notable because his mathematical "descendants," which include Carl Friedrich Gauss, number more than 170,000 (largely due to his son).

== Family ==
Leibniz was married three times. His first marriage was on 31 January 1625 to Anna Fritzsche, who died on 14 March 1634 in Leipzig, the daughter of Mag. Benedict Fritzsche. From the marriage came six known children, only two of whom lived to adulthood:

- Johann Friedrich Leibniz (16 January 1632, Leipzig – 19 March 1696 ibid.) 1650 Uni. Leipzig, 13 July 1650 Bacc. Phil. ibid., 27 January 1653 Mag. Phil. ibid., 1660 teacher Leipzig, 1667 professor and third colleague at the Thomas School in Leipzig, married on 25 August 1668 in Altenburg Dorothea Elisabeth Schmalz (16 April or 18 April 1649, Altkirchen – 6 August 1681, Leipzig), daughter of the archdeacon in Altenburg Magnus Schmalz (11 March 1615, Kohren- 12 December 1683, Altenburg) and Regina Freiesleben (9 September 1629, Altenburg- 28 June 1675, Altenburg)
- Johann Gottfried Leibniz (died young)
- Elisabeth Leibniz (died young)
- Anna Magdalena Leibniz (died young)
- Susanna Leibniz (died young)
- Anna Rosina Leibniz (25 December 1629, Leipzig – 26 March 1666, Orlamünde) married in February 1653 in Leipzig with the Mag. and later superintendent in Orlamünde Heinrich Freiesleben (5 January 1628, Altenburg – 26 March 1666, Orlamünde)

After two years of widowhood, he entered into his second marriage on 24 May 1636 to Dorothea Voigt (18 July 1599, Leipzig – 25 January 1643, Leipzig), the daughter of the Leipzig citizen and bookseller Bartholomäus Voigt (11 April 1564, Halle (Saale)- 18 January 1637, Leipzig) and Maria (née Rambau). The marriage remained childless.

His third marriage was on 21 May 1644 in Leipzig to Catharina Schmuck (5 November 1621, Leipzig – 6 February 1664, Leipzig), the daughter of Professor Dr. jur. and Mag. Phil. Wilhelm Schmuck (1 May 1575, Suhl – 28 December 1634, Leipzig) and Gertraude Lindner, the daughter of Johann Lindner and Elisabeth Clode/Klodt. From the marriage came a son and a daughter:

- Gottfried Wilhelm Leibniz (21 June 1646 – 14 November 1716)
- Anna Katharina Leibniz (31 July or 1 August 1648, Leipzig – 13 February 1672 ibid.), married on 25 September 1666 in Leipzig with the Lic. theol. and Vesper preacher Simon Loeffler (1627–1674).
