= Best of all possible worlds =

Concept in metaphysics

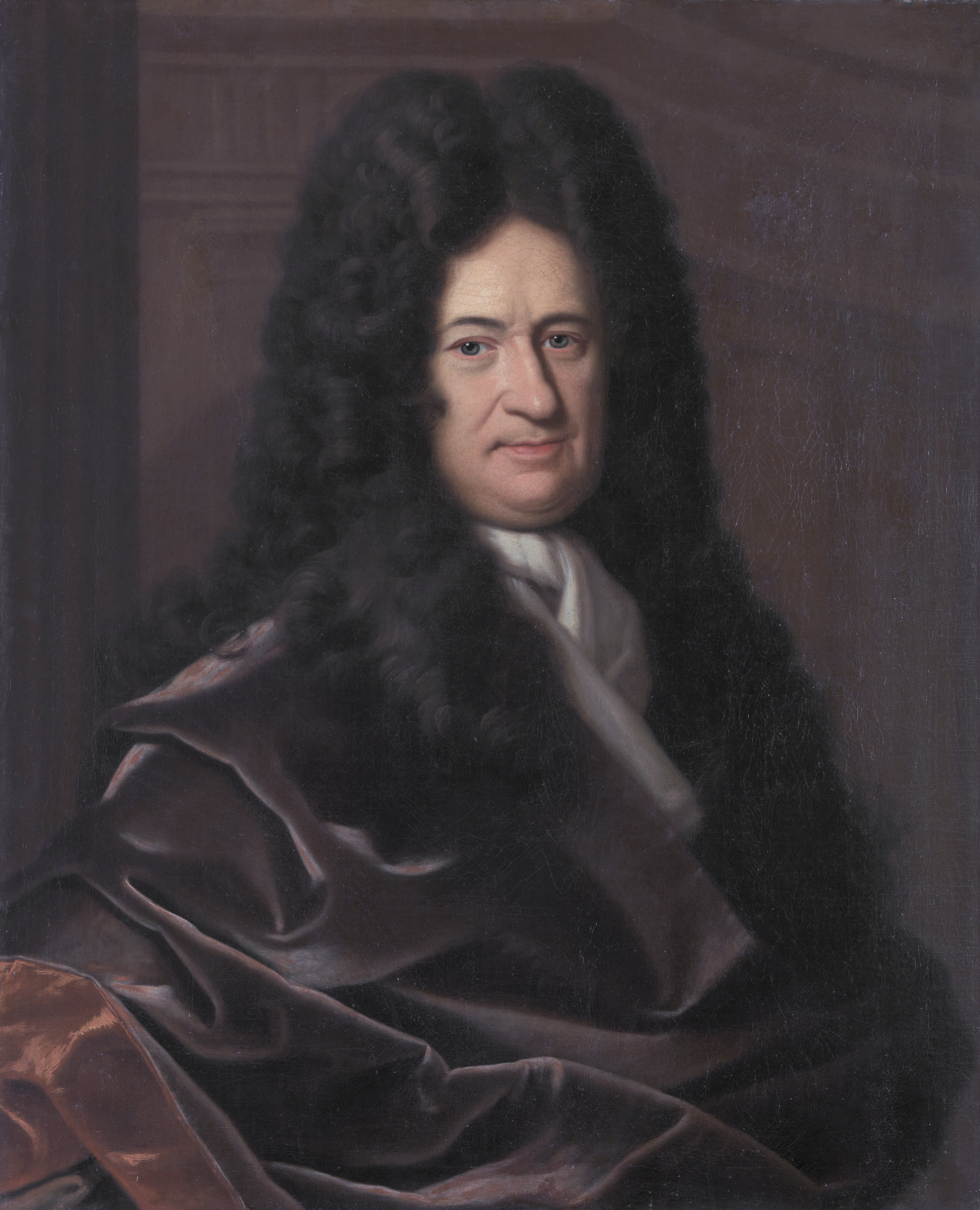
Gottfried Leibniz, the philosopher who coined the term "best of all possible worlds" in his 1710 work Théodicée.

The phrase "the best of all possible worlds" (French: Le meilleur des mondes possibles; German: Die beste aller möglichen Welten) was coined by the German polymath and Enlightenment philosopher Gottfried Leibniz in his 1710 work Essais de Théodicée sur la bonté de Dieu, la liberté de l'homme et l'origine du mal (Essays of Theodicy on the Goodness of God, the Freedom of Man and the Origin of Evil), more commonly known simply as the Theodicy. The claim that the actual world is the best of all possible worlds is the central argument in Leibniz's theodicy, or his attempt to solve the problem of evil.

== Leibniz ==
In Leibniz's works, the argument about the best of all possible worlds appears in the context of his theodicy, a word that he coined by combining the Greek words Theos, 'God', and dikē, 'justice'. Its object was to solve the problem of evil—that is, to reconcile the existence of evil and suffering in the world with the existence of a perfectly good, all-powerful and all-knowing God, who would seem required to prevent it. As such, the name comes from Leibniz's conceiving of the project as the vindication of God's justice, namely against the charges of injustice brought against him by such evils. Proving that this is the best of all possible worlds would dispel such charges by showing that, no matter how it may intuitively appear to us from our limited point of view, any other world—such as, namely, one without the evils which trouble our lives—would, in fact, have been worse than the current one, all things considered.

Leibniz's argument for this conclusion may be gathered from the paragraphs 53–55 of his Monadology, which run as follows:

53. Now as there are an infinity of possible universes in the ideas of God, and but one of them can exist, there must be a sufficient reason for the choice of God which determines him to select one rather than another.

54. And this reason is to be found only in the fitness or in the degree of perfection which these worlds possess, each possible thing having the right to claim existence in proportion to the perfection which it involves.

55. This is the cause for the existence of the greatest good; namely, that the wisdom of God permits him to know it, his goodness causes him to choose it, and his power enables him to produce it.

Since this is a very compact exposition, the remainder of this section will explain the argument in more words. While the text refers to "possible universes", this article will often adopt the more common usage "possible worlds", which refers to the same thing, which is explained next. As Leibniz said in the Theodicy, this term should not be misunderstood as referring only to a single planet or reality, since it refers to the sum of everything that exists:

I call 'World' the whole succession and the whole agglomeration of all existent things, lest it be said that several worlds could have existed in different times and different places.

=== Possible worlds ===
Possible worlds, according to Leibniz's theory, are combinations of beings which are possible together, that is, compossible.

A being is possible, for Leibniz, when it is logically possible, i.e., when its definition involves no contradiction. For example, a married bachelor is impossible because a "bachelor" is, by definition, an unmarried man, which contradicts "married". But a unicorn, if defined as a horse with a horn, contains no contradiction, so that such a being is possible, even if none exist in the actual world.

Beings are possible together, in turn, when they do not enter into contradiction with each other. For instance, it is logically possible that a meteor might have fallen from the sky onto Wikipedia founder Jimmy Wales's head soon after he was born, killing him. But it is not logically possible that what happens in a given world (e.g. that Jimmy Wales founded Wikipedia) also does not happen in the same world (i.e. that Jimmy Wales did not found Wikipedia). While both of these events are logically possible in themselves, they are not logically possible together, or compossible—so, they cannot form part of the same possible world.

Leibniz claims in §53, then, that there are infinitely many of these possible worlds, or combinations of compossible beings, in the ideas of God. These are the worlds which God could possibly bring into existence, since not even God, according to Leibniz, could create a world which contains a contradiction.

=== Sufficient reason ===
Although God cannot create a self-contradictory world, he is all-powerful and all-knowing, as emphasized in §55. He cannot be prevented from creating a world by not knowing about it, or by lacking the power to make it. Given these assumptions, it might seem that God could create just any one of the worlds. And since there are infinitely many possible worlds, it might seem that, just as there is no greatest among the infinitely many numbers, (Note: Leibniz himself affirmed, in his Discourse on Metaphysics, that the idea of a greatest number was self-contradictory: We must also know what perfection is. One thing which can surely be affirmed about it is that those forms or natures which are not susceptible of it to the highest degree, say the nature of numbers or of figures, do not permit of perfection. This is because the number which is the greatest of all (that is, the sum of all the numbers), and likewise the greatest of all figures, imply contradictions. The greatest knowledge, however, and omnipotence contain no impossibility. Consequently power and knowledge do admit of perfection, and in so far as they pertain to God they have no limits.) there is no best of the possible worlds.

Leibniz rejects these possibilities by appealing to the Principle of Sufficient Reason (PSR), a central principle of his philosophical system. This principle, which he was the first to name, was once described by him as the principle "that nothing happens without a reason"; in the Monadology, which is the work at hand, he described it as follows:

31. Our reasoning is based upon two great principles: first, that of contradiction, by means of which we decide that to be false which involves contradiction and that to be true which contradicts or is opposed to the false. 32. And second, the principle of sufficient reason, in virtue of which we believe that no fact can be real or existing and no statement true unless it has a sufficient reason why it should be thus and not otherwise. Most frequently, however, these reasons cannot be known by us.

Since Leibniz adopted his principle, he could not admit that God chose to create this world rather than another—that God's choice was "thus and not otherwise"—for no reason, or "arbitrarily".

Leibniz then claims that the only possible reason for the choice between these possible worlds is "the fitness or the degree of perfection" which they possess—i.e., the quality which makes worlds better than others, so that the world with the greatness "fitness" or "perfection" is the best one. As the philosophers Michael Murray and Sean Greenberg interpreted it, this claim may be understood by the consideration that basing the choice on any other quality about the worlds would have been arbitrary, contrary to the PSR.

Leibniz claims that God's choice is caused not only by its being the most reasonable, but also by God's perfect goodness, a traditional claim about God which Leibniz accepted. (Note: While the presentation of the argument in the Monadology only mentions God's goodness in passing, Leibniz mentions God's goodness, and its foundation on tradition, more at length in chapter 3 of his Discourse on Metaphysics: I think that one acts imperfectly if he acts with less perfection than he is capable of. To show that an architect could have done better is to find fault with his work. Furthermore this opinion is contrary to the Holy Scriptures when they assure us of the goodness of God's work.) As Leibniz says in §55, God's goodness causes him to produce the best world. Hence, the best possible world, or "greatest good" as Leibniz called it in this work, must be the one that exists.

=== Evil in the best world ===
Leibniz, following a long metaphysical tradition that goes back at least to Augustine, conceived of the perfection of the universe as its "metaphysical goodness", which is identical with "being", or "reality". The best world is the one with the greatest "degree of reality", the greatest "quantity of essence", the greatest "perfection" and "intelligibility". According to this tradition, "evil, though real, is not a 'thing', but rather a direction away from the goodness of the One"; evil is the absence of good, and accordingly, it is technically wrong to say that God created evil, properly speaking. Rather, he created a world which was imperfectly good.

According to the privation theory of evil, all examples of evils are analysed as consisting in the absence of some good that ought to be there, or is natural to a thing—for instance, disease is the absence of health, blindness is the absence of sight, and vice is the absence of virtue. Evil may be said to exist in the same way the hole of a donut exists: the donut was created, but the hole itself was not made, it was just never filled in—it is an absence. And just as the hole could not exist without the donut, evil is parasitic upon good, since it is the corruption of a good nature. "God is infinite, and the devil is limited; the good may and does go to infinity, while evil has its bounds."

Leibniz did, nevertheless, concede that God has created a world with evil in it, and could have created a world without it. He claimed, however, that the existence of evil does not necessarily mean a worse world, so that this is still the best world that God could have made. In fact, Leibniz claimed that the presence of evil may make for a better world, insofar as "it may happen that the evil is accompanied by a greater good"—as he said, "an imperfection in the part may be required for a perfection in the whole".

In light of the conceptual tools that have already been explained, this claim may be phrased as stating that there are goods in the universe which would not be compossible with the prevention of certain evils. This claim, which may seem counterintuitive, was elucidated by Leibniz in various ways. For instance, in the Theodicy, he used certain analogies to emphasize how the contrast provided by evil may increase the good, and make it more discernible:

Use has ever been made of comparisons taken from the pleasures of the senses when these are mingled with that which borders on pain, to prove that there is something of like nature in intellectual pleasures. A little acid, sharpness or bitterness is often more pleasing than sugar; shadows enhance colours; and even a dissonance in the right place gives relief to harmony. We wish to be terrified by rope-dancers on the point of falling and we wish that tragedies shall well-nigh cause us to weep. Do men relish health enough, or thank God enough for it, without having ever been sick? And is it not most often necessary that a little evil render the good more discernible, that is to say, greater?

In other works, Leibniz also used his broader theory that there are no "purely extrinsic denominations"—everything that may be said about something is essential to it. So, according to Leibniz, it is technically wrong to say that "I would be better off" in another possible world: each individual is world-bound, so that, if God had not actualized this specific world, I would not exist at all. And even if, due to my great personal suffering, I should think that it would be better for me to not exist, it would nevertheless be worse for the rest of the universe, since this world is the best possible world, as was proved.

=== Uses outside of theodicy ===
Leibniz also applied his theory of the best of all possible worlds to solve the problem of induction. Out of all possible worlds, God has chosen "the most perfect, that is to say, the one which is at the same time the simplest in hypotheses and the richest in phenomena". (Discourse on Metaphysics, §6) This justifies human beings in choosing to believe, out of the available theories, those which are simplest and have the most explanatory power.

== Before Leibniz ==
The philosopher Calvin Normore has claimed that, according to the Stoics, this is the best of all possible worlds, and that this opinion was shared by Peter Abelard.

Avicenna argued that divine providence ensures that this is the best of all possible worlds.

Thomas Aquinas, in article 6 of question 25 of the first part of his Summa Theologiae, had affirmed that God can always make better what he has made, but only by making more things; "the present creation being supposed, cannot be better."

== After Leibniz ==
=== 18th century ===
Following the devastating Lisbon Earthquake (1 November 1755), which occurred decades after the publication of the Theodicy (1710), Leibniz's philosophical optimism and theodicy incurred considerable criticism both from his fellow Enlightenment philosophers and from Christian theologians. Critics of Leibniz argue that the world contains an amount of suffering too great to permit belief in philosophical optimism.

The claim that we live in the best of all possible worlds drew scorn most notably from Voltaire, who lampooned it in his comic novella Candide by having the character Dr. Pangloss (a parody of Leibniz and Maupertuis) repeat it like a mantra when great catastrophes keep happening to him and the titular protagonist. Derived from this character, the adjective "Panglossian" describes a person who believes that the actual world is the best possible one, or is otherwise excessively optimistic.

=== 19th century ===
The physiologist Emil du Bois-Reymond, in his "Leibnizian Thoughts in Modern Science" (1870), wrote that Leibniz thought of God as a mathematician:

As is well known, the theory of the maxima and minima of functions was indebted to him for the greatest progress through the discovery of the method of tangents. Well, he conceives God in the creation of the world like a mathematician who is solving a minimum problem, or rather, in our modern phraseology, a problem in the calculus of variations – the question being to determine among an infinite number of possible worlds, that for which the sum of necessary evil is a minimum.

Du Bois-Reymond believed that Charles Darwin supported a version of Leibniz's perfect world, since every organism can be understood as relatively adapted to its environment at any point in its evolution.

Arthur Schopenhauer argued, contrary to Leibniz, that our world must be the worst of all possible worlds, because if it were only a little worse, it could not continue to exist.

=== 20th century ===
The Theodicy was deemed illogical by the philosopher Bertrand Russell. Russell argues that moral and physical evil must result from metaphysical evil (imperfection). But imperfection is merely limitation; if existence is good, as Leibniz maintains, then the mere existence of evil requires that evil also be good. In addition, libertarian Christian theology (not related to political libertarianism) defines sin as not necessary but contingent, the result of free will. Russell maintains that Leibniz failed to logically show that metaphysical necessity (divine will) and human free will are not incompatible or contradictory. He also claims that when Leibniz analyzes the propositions, he is "ambiguous or doubtful..." (O'Briant). That is, Leibniz does not sound sure, and is unsure of himself when he writes his premises; and they do not work together without making Leibniz sound unsure of himself.

=== 21st century ===
The philosopher Alvin Plantinga criticized Leibniz's theodicy by arguing that there probably is not such a thing as the best of all possible worlds, since one can always conceive a better world, such as a world with one more morally righteous person.

The philosopher William C. Lane defended Leibniz from Plantinga's criticism and also claimed that Leibniz's theory has pandeistic consequences:

If divine becoming were complete, God's kenosis – God's self-emptying for the sake of love – would be total. In this pandeistic view, nothing of God would remain separate and apart from what God would become. Any separate divine existence would be inconsistent with God's unreserved participation in the lives and fortunes of the actualized phenomena."

Leibniz's theodicy has been defended by Justin Daeley, who argues that God must create the best, and James Franklin, who argues that goods and evils in creation are interconnected with mathematical necessity and hence cannot be separated by divine power.

== See also ==
- Divine simplicity
- Fine-tuned universe
- Is-ought problem
- Summum bonum
- World to Come
