= Transcendental law of homogeneity =

Heuristic principle enunciated by Gottfried Wilhelm Leibniz

In mathematics, the transcendental law of homogeneity (TLH) is a heuristic principle enunciated by Gottfried Wilhelm Leibniz most clearly in a 1710 text entitled Symbolismus memorabilis calculi algebraici et infinitesimalis in comparatione potentiarum et differentiarum, et de lege homogeneorum transcendentali. Henk J. M. Bos describes it as the principle to the effect that in a sum involving infinitesimals of different orders, only the lowest-order term must be retained, and the remainder discarded. Thus, if $a$ is finite and $dx$ is infinitesimal, then one sets

$$a+dx=a.$$

Similarly,

$$u\,dv+v\,du+du\,dv=u\,dv+v\,du,$$

where the higher-order term du dv is discarded in accordance with the TLH. A 2012 study argues that Leibniz's TLH was a precursor of the standard part function over the hyperreals.

== See also ==
- Law of continuity
- Adequality
