= Law of continuity =

Principle that whatever succeeds for the finite also succeeds for the infinite

The law of continuity is a heuristic principle introduced by Gottfried Leibniz based on earlier work by Nicholas of Cusa and Johannes Kepler. It is the principle that "whatever succeeds for the finite, also succeeds for the infinite". Kepler used the law of continuity to calculate the area of the circle by representing it as an infinite-sided polygon with infinitesimal sides, and adding the areas of infinitely many triangles with infinitesimal bases. Leibniz used the principle to extend concepts such as arithmetic operations from ordinary numbers to infinitesimals, laying the groundwork for infinitesimal calculus. The transfer principle provides a mathematical implementation of the law of continuity in the context of the hyperreal numbers.

A related law of continuity concerning intersection numbers in geometry was promoted by Jean-Victor Poncelet in his "Traité des propriétés projectives des figures".

== Leibniz's formulation ==
Leibniz expressed the law in the following terms in 1701:

In any supposed continuous transition, ending in any terminus, it is permissible to institute a general reasoning, in which the final terminus may also be included (Cum Prodiisset).

In a 1702 letter to French mathematician Pierre Varignon subtitled “Justification of the Infinitesimal Calculus by that of Ordinary Algebra," Leibniz adequately summed up the true meaning of his law, stating that "the rules of the finite are found to succeed in the infinite."

The law of continuity became important to Leibniz's justification and conceptualization of the infinitesimal calculus.

== See also ==
- Transcendental law of homogeneity
- Uniformitarianism
- As above, so below
