= New Essays on Human Understanding =

Work by Gottfried Wilhelm Leibniz

New Essays on Human Understanding (French: Nouveaux essais sur l'entendement humain) is a chapter-by-chapter rebuttal by Gottfried Leibniz of John Locke's major work An Essay Concerning Human Understanding (1689). It is one of only two full-length works by Leibniz (the other being the Theodicy). It was finished in 1704, but Locke's death was the cause alleged by Leibniz to withhold its publication. The book was published in 1765, some 60 years following its completion. Leibniz had died in 1716, and never saw its published form.

Like many philosophical works of the time, it is written in dialogue form.

== Overview ==
The two speakers in the book are Theophilus ("lover of God" in Greek), who represents the views of Leibniz, and Philalethes ("lover of truth" in Greek), who represents those of Locke. The famous rebuttal to the empiricist thesis about the provenance of ideas appears at the beginning of Book II: "Nothing is in the mind without being first in the senses, except for the mind itself". All of Locke's major arguments against innate ideas are criticized at length by Leibniz, who defends an extreme view of innate cognition, according to which all thoughts and actions of the soul are innate. In addition to his discussion of innate ideas, Leibniz offers penetrating criticisms of Locke's views on personal identity, free will, mind-body dualism, language, necessary truth, and Locke's attempted proof of the existence of God.

== Editions ==
- New Essays on Human Understanding, 2nd ed., translated and edited by Peter Remnant and Jonathan Bennett, New York: Cambridge University Press, 1996, ISBN 0-521-57660-1.

== See also ==
- Implicit cognition

== Sources ==
- G. W. Leibniz, Akademie-Ausgabe (1999): Vol. VI.
