= Théodicée =

1710 book on philosophy by Gottfried Leibniz

The Theodicy
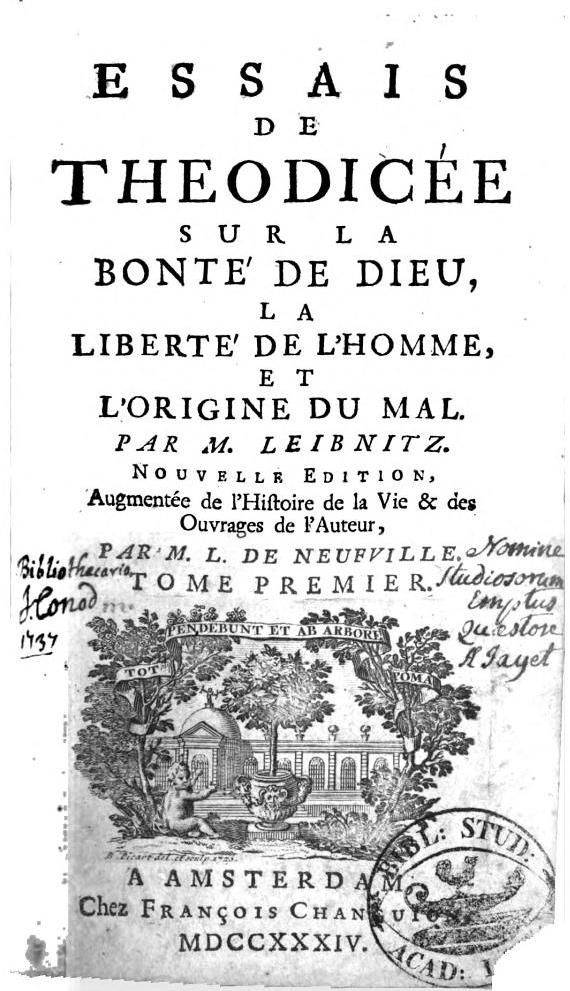
- Théodicée title page from a 1734 version
- Author: Gottfried Leibniz
- Original title: Essais de Théodicée sur la bonté de Dieu, la liberté de l'homme et l'origine du mal
- Language: French
- Publication date: 1710

Essais de Théodicée sur la bonté de Dieu, la liberté de l'homme et l'origine du mal (from French: Essays of Theodicy on the Goodness of God, the Freedom of Man and the Origin of Evil), more simply known as Théodicée [te.ɔ.di.se], is a book of philosophy by the German polymath Gottfried Leibniz. The book, published in 1710, introduced the term theodicy, and its optimistic approach to the problem of evil is thought to have inspired Voltaire's Candide (albeit satirically). Much of the work consists of a response to the ideas of the French philosopher Pierre Bayle and based on the author's conversation with Sophia Charlotte of Hanover, with whom Leibniz carried on a debate for many years.

Théodicée was the only book Leibniz published during his lifetime; his other book, New Essays on Human Understanding, was published after his death, in 1765.

== Central claims ==
In various works, including his famous Historical and Critical Dictionary (1697), Pierre Bayle had argued that there is no defensible rational solution to the problem of why God permits evil. More specifically, Bayle had argued that powerful philosophical arguments can be given against a number of orthodox Christian teachings, including the goodness, justice, and freedom of God. Leibniz responds to Bayle's arguments in detail, arguing that it can be proved that God is an infinitely perfect being, and that such a being must have created a world that has the greatest possible balance of good over evil ("the best of all possible worlds").

Leibniz distinguishes three forms of evil: moral, physical, and metaphysical. Moral evil is sin, physical evil is pain, and metaphysical evil is limitation. God permits moral and physical evil for the sake of greater goods, and metaphysical evil (i.e., limitation) is unavoidable since any created universe must necessarily fall short of God's absolute perfection. Human free will is consistent with God's foreknowledge, because even though all events in the universe are foreseen and pre-determined, they are not necessitated (i.e., logically necessary), and only if human choices were necessitated would free will be an illusion.

Against Bayle's claims (derived from Augustine) that it is unjust for God to damn unbaptized infants or adult non-Christians who had lived as well as they could, Leibniz denies that Christian teaching supports such claims. Against Bayle's claim that God cannot be free since he cannot fail to choose the best, Leibniz argues that such "moral necessity" is consistent with divine freedom. God would lack freedom only if there are no possible worlds in which less than maximal goodness exists, which is not the case, Leibniz argues.

== Sources ==
- Farrer, Austin (1985). Introduction to Theodicy. La Salle: Open Court. ISBN 0-87548-437-9.
- Leibniz, G. W. (1985). Theodicy: Essays on the Goodness of God, the Freedom of Man, and the Origin of Evil. Translated by Huggard, E. M. La Salle: Open Court.
- Murray, Michael (16 March 2005). "Leibniz on the Problem of Evil". The Stanford Encyclopedia of Philosophy.
