= Leibniz theorem =

Leibniz theorem (named after Gottfried Wilhelm Leibniz) may refer to one of the following:

- Product rule in differential calculus
- General Leibniz rule, a generalization of the product rule
- Leibniz integral rule
- The alternating series test, also called Leibniz's rule
- The Fundamental theorem of calculus, also called Newton-Leibniz theorem.
- Leibniz formula for π

== See also ==
- Leibniz (disambiguation)
- Leibniz' law (disambiguation)
- List of things named after Gottfried Leibniz
