= Michael Loam =

English engineer

- Born: 1 November 1797; Ludgvan, Cornwall, England
- Died: 14 July 1871 (aged 73); Botusfleming, Cornwall, England
- Occupation: Engineer
- Engineering career
- Discipline: Civil
- Projects: First man engine in the UK

Michael Loam (1 November 1797 – 14 July 1871) was an English engineer who introduced the first man engine (a device to carry men up and down the shaft of a mine) into the UK.

In 1834, concerned for the health of miners and for the loss in profits incurred by their long, slow climbs by ladders, the Royal Cornwall Polytechnic Society announced a prize for the design of a better system of transporting miners in and out of the deep mines in the county. Michael Loam won this prize in 1841 for his man engine, despite evidence that it was already in use in the Hartz Mountains in Germany.

Inspired by the German designs and constructed of a series of moving platforms, the first man engine was installed in 1842 at Tresavean Mine—one of the deepest in Cornwall at the time. Its adoption was encouraged by the mine's owner, John Rogers.

Loam was trained as an engineer at Wheal Abraham by Arthur Woolf. He remained active in the metal mining and smelting industries in Cornwall and is noted as an investor in the Tamar Tin Smelting Company in 1863.

The operation of a double-acting man engine, like Loam's
