= Nice Cup of Tea and a Sit Down =

Food and drink website

Nice Cup of Tea and a Sit Down is a website which mainly discusses tea and biscuits, with content including news and reviews of biscuit brands. It is owned and maintained by Stuart Payne and his wife Jenny Payne, who live in Cambridge, England, and spawned a spin-off book of the same name.

== "Nicey" and "Wifey" ==
The website's creators, marital partners Stuart and Jenny Payne, are best known under their pseudonyms "Nicey" and "Wifey". As the website increased in popularity, Stuart Payne was interviewed in the mainstream press and became "one of the world's most sought-after biscuit critics", with biscuit manufacturers sending him free samples in the hope of a favourable review. Payne's views were sought by the BBC on the launch of the leading American Oreo cookie into the UK. The favourite biscuit of Stuart Payne has been reported as the "groundbreaking" Abbey Crunch.

== Website ==
The website takes a humorous look at quintessentially British topics. The most common topics are tea, biscuits, cake and "sit downs". The website has been featured on the BBC website and their weekly technology TV programme Click, The Times, The Daily Telegraph and The Guardian newspapers, as well as the Richard & Judy chatshow. In September 2006, the British Library proposed that Nice Cup of Tea and a Sit Down should be archived along with other socially significant websites.

== Book ==
The Nice Cup of Tea and a Sit Down book.

As a spinoff from the website the couple authored a book on the subject, Nice Cup of Tea and a Sit Down. It has the following sections:

- A Nice Cup of Tea

Starts with "My worst cup of tea ever" and reviews the different sorts of tea and methods of making them, including discussion of teabags, teapots, kettles and mugs.

- Some Biscuits

The main part of the book, includes the technical definitions of all sorts of biscuits from the simple Rich Tea to the complex such as the Penguin, with advice on storage, dunking and enjoyment. These are mostly British, with a final section on foreign ones which have entered the UK market such as Tim Tam or Choco Leibniz. A Venn diagram shows the distinctions and overlaps between the categories biscuit, cake, bread, crackers, chocolate biscuits and chocolate bars.

- A Little Bit of Cake

Covers Jaffa Cake, wedding cake, fairy cakes, packet cakes, ginger cake and Battenberg, with discussion of icing and glacé cherries.

- And a Sit Down

Sitting down in a comfy chair is advised, but advice is given on other tea situations, including in moving vehicles, and in public places such as cafés. Caution is advised with vending machines, and the Christmas season is discussed.
