= Theft of the golden Leibniz cookie =

2013 event in Hanover, Germany

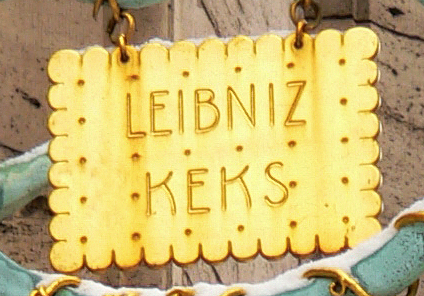
The stolen Leibniz cookie on the facade of the Bahlsen company (2006)

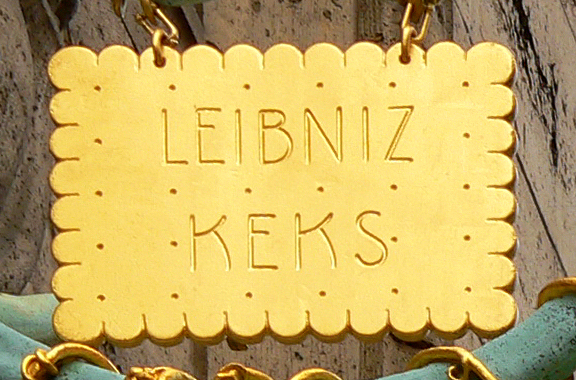
The cookie restored and rehung after the theft (2013)

The theft of the golden Leibniz cookie was a theft that took place in 2013 in Hanover, Lower Saxony in Germany. This gilded brass representation of the Leibniz cookie, created by sculptor Georg Herting around 1910, garnered significant media attention both nationally and internationally. The incident involved a ransom demand and an unusual resolution that included charitable donations. Despite the extensive coverage, the identity of the thieves was never discovered.

== Course of events ==
In early 2013, no later than January 21, 2013, the golden Leibniz cookie was stolen from the facade of the headquarters of the cookie manufacturer Bahlsen by thieves who remain unidentified to this day (2023). The stolen item was a gilded brass depiction of a Leibniz cookie, weighing around 20 kilograms, created by the sculptor Georg Herting around 1910, along with the pretzel-shaped figures known as the Brezelmänner (Pretzel Men). Shortly after the theft, the Hannoversche Allgemeine Zeitung and Bahlsen received a ransom note. The note, which included a photo of an unidentified person dressed in a Cookie Monster costume posing with the cookie, demanded that Bahlsen donate chocolate cookies to the children's hospital auf der Bult and the €1,000 reward to an animal shelter in Langenhagen. Otherwise, the note threatened, the golden cookie would be sent "to Oscar in the trash can."

In a press conference on January 30, Bahlsen refused to comply with the extortionist's demands. Instead, the company offered to donate 52,000 packs of cookies to 52 social institutions if the cookie was returned. In response, the perpetrator, in a second letter dated February 4, expressed willingness to return the cookie, mentioning Bahlsen's managing director, Werner Michael Bahlsen, by name. The cookie was eventually found on February 5, tied with a red ribbon to the bronze statue of the Lower Saxony horse in front of Leibniz University in Hanover. The police confirmed that it was indeed the stolen cookie and launched an investigation against the unknown perpetrators for theft and extortion. The State Criminal Police Office of Lower Saxony examined the recovered cookie for fingerprints, DNA, and fiber traces.

In a third letter dated February 7, the Cookie Monster urged Bahlsen to fulfill its promise. On February 8, the company confirmed that it would honor its commitment and invited all interested charitable organizations to apply for a cookie donation.

On February 14, 2013, the TV magazine RTL Explosiv aired an anonymous interview with three men and a woman who claimed to be the perpetrators. After the cookie was returned, the Hanover public prosecutor's office reclassified the initially suspected crimes of attempted extortion and theft as property damage. A day later, on March 14, Bahlsen announced the recipients of the cookie donations, selected by a lottery, and began distribution. In May 2013, the Hanover public prosecutor's office closed the case, as the identity of the perpetrators could not be determined.

== Reactions ==
The incident attracted significant attention in both national and international media. According to the business magazine Markt und Mittelstand, the company appeared in the German daily and weekly press 595 times between January 24, 2013, and February 11, 2013, not including online coverage and social media. In comparison, during the same period the previous year, the company was mentioned only 22 times. The magazine estimated that achieving a similar level of exposure through advertising would have required a budget of around 1.7 million euros, while the actual cost of the cookie donation campaign was estimated at less than 40,000 euros. The media attention even prompted the producers of Sesame Street to issue a statement via the "real" Cookie Monster's Twitter account, firmly denying any involvement in the case.

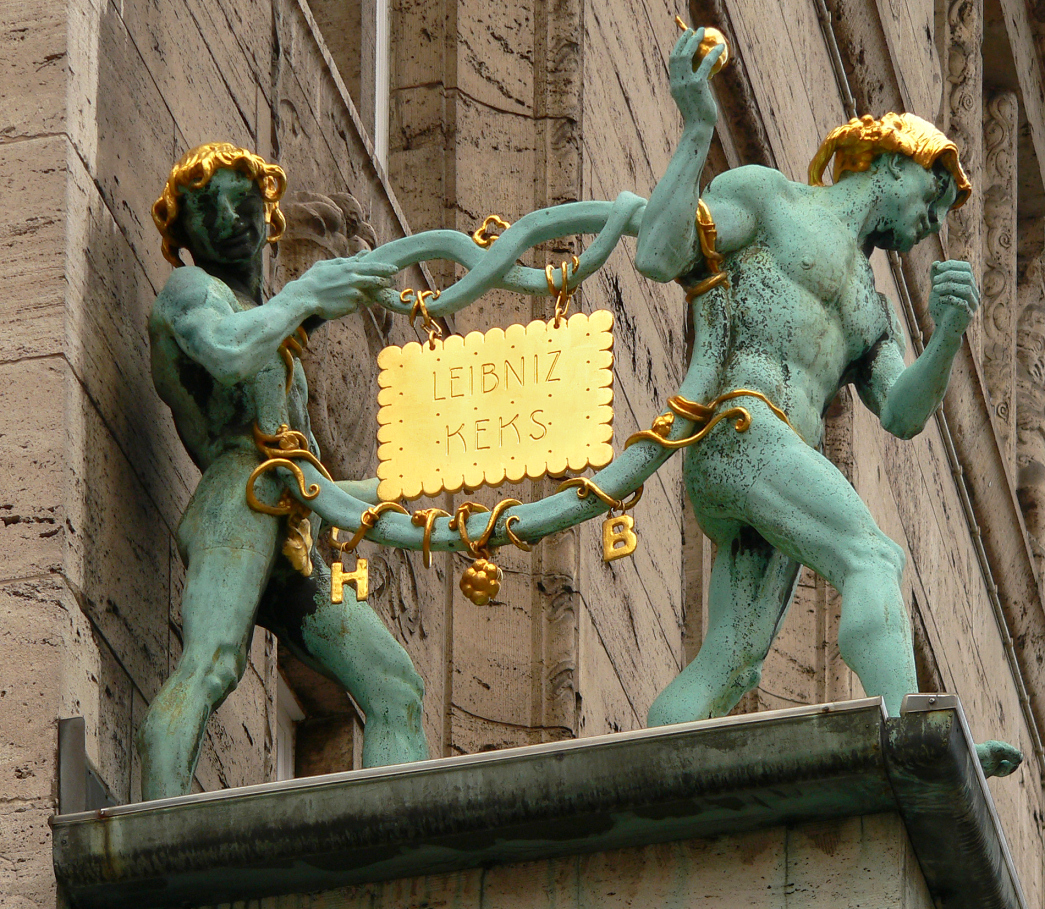
The cookie, which had been restored, was rehung in July 2013 alongside the Brezelmänner figures on the building's facade.

The incident led to speculation that it was merely a cleverly orchestrated marketing stunt (guerilla marketing). Notably, Sesame Street was celebrating its 40th anniversary that same year. Additionally, both the perpetrators and the company used striking symbolism connected to Bahlsen: in reference to the 52 “teeth” of the cookie, 52,000 packs of cookies were donated to 52 organizations, and the cookie was returned on February 5 at the campus of the Leibniz University, named after the Hanoverian court librarian and the cookie's namesake, Gottfried Wilhelm Leibniz. However, the stolen cookie actually had only 34 “teeth” compared to the modern version with 52.

A Wiesbaden-based advertising agency offered the perpetrators a job as PR consultants through large-scale job advertisements in several media outlets, even before the cookie was returned. However, Bahlsen denied any involvement in the stunt. The police confirmed to the marketing magazine horizont.net that Bahlsen had filed charges for theft and extortion. In an interview with the magazine, Stephan Rebbe, head of the communications agency working for Bahlsen, reiterated that the theft could not have been used for marketing purposes. He pointed out that it was a criminal act and that such a move could encourage copycat extortion attempts. However, legal experts remain divided on whether the perpetrators committed a punishable offense.

== Reception ==
The ZDF series Dr. Klein referenced the Leibniz cookie theft in the episode Dicke Luft. In the show, the stolen item was depicted as a golden pretzel belonging to the "Pretzel King," which was also stolen in a similar manner.

The RTL series Schmidt – Chaos auf Rezept also referenced the event in the episode "Hochzeitstag." In this episode, a young man dressed as a hamster steals a ten-kilogram gilded cookie, which is the company Hegel's landmark and emblem. However, unlike the real-life case, no ransom is demanded, nor are there any charitable donations from the company—the cookie is returned without any conditions.
