= Man engine =

Vertical transport system used in mines

The operation of a double-acting man engine

A man engine is a mechanism of reciprocating ladders and stationary platforms installed in mines to assist the miners' journeys to and from the working levels. It was invented in Germany in the 19th century and was a prominent feature of tin and copper mines in Cornwall until the beginning of the twentieth century.

== Operation ==
In the Cornish examples the motive power was provided by waterwheels, or one of the mine's steam engines. The steam engine or water wheel would be linked to a series of beams – known as "rods" – fastened together and reaching to the bottom of the mineshaft. These were arranged to offer a reciprocating motion of, typically, twelve to fifteen feet (three to five metres). Small foot platforms were attached to the rods at the same distance apart as the engine stroke and fixed platforms ("sollars") were built onto the shaft walls, spaced to coincide with the top and bottom positions of each of the moving platforms. The moving platforms were often small, typically 12 inches (30 centimetres) square, to make the miner stand close to the centre-line of the rod and thus keep a safe distance from the sides of the shaft. For the same reason the grab handles were always fitted directly above the foot platforms.

To go up or down, the miner would step onto the travelling platform and allow himself to be carried to the next fixed platform, where he would step off and wait. At the end of the next stroke the next moving platform would line up and he could step onto it and repeat the process. Miners could ascend and descend at the same time: the pause at the changeover point was made long enough (typically between two and eight seconds) for two men to change places. To facilitate this some installations (such as at the Devon Great Consols mine, Tavistock) had a fixed platform at both sides of the shaft, one side for miners descending and one for those on the ascent. Counterweights – large boxes filled with stones attached through "see-sawing" horizontal beams – were installed to avoid the full weight of the shaft and men bearing on the top linkage. In the deepest mines, which could sink to more than 350 fathoms (640 metres), extra counterweights were provided at regular intervals, in horizontal side galleries.

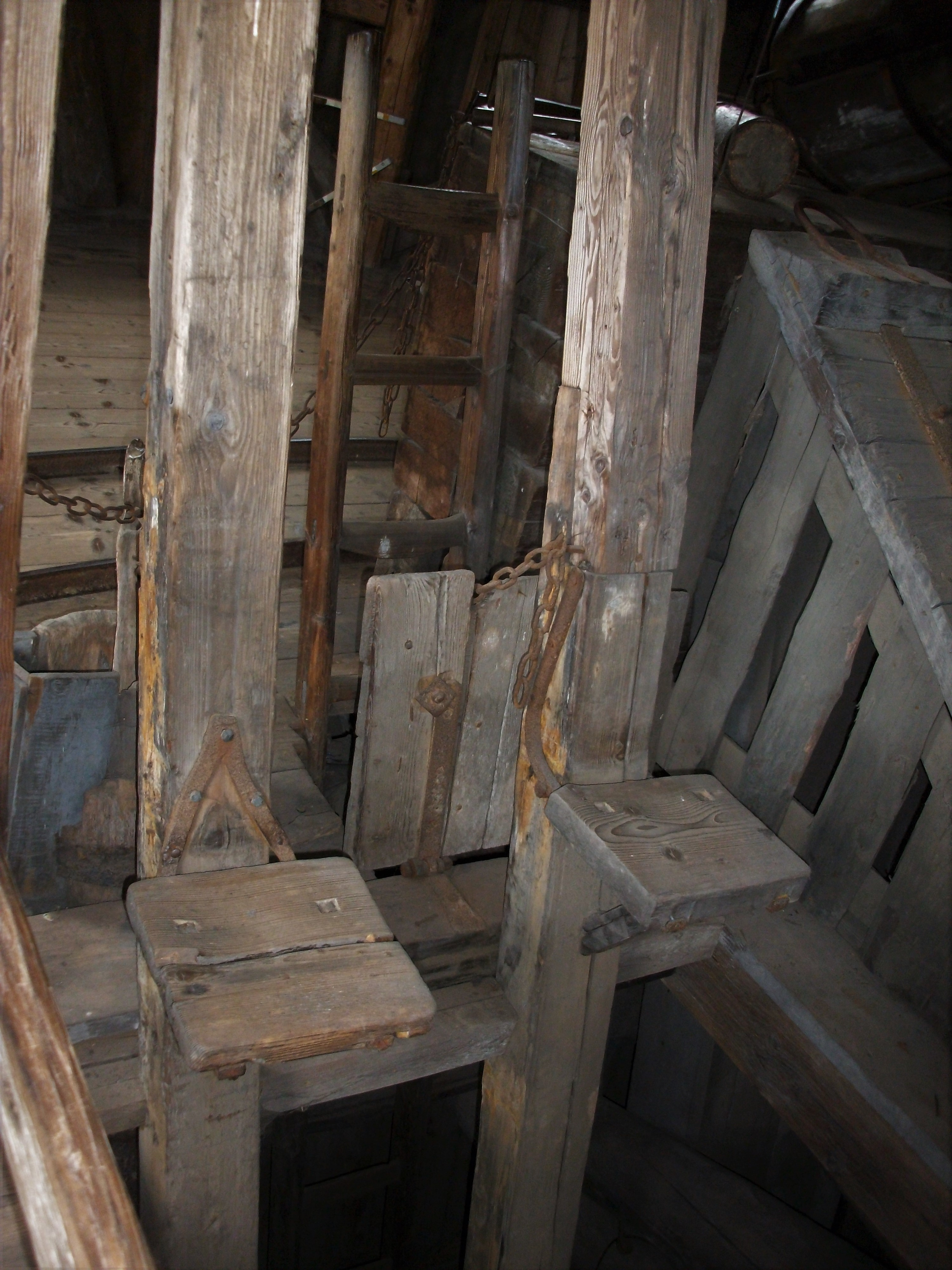
Two-rod example at the Upper Harz Mine Museum, Germany

In a common variation a pair of rods was used, with one on its upstroke as the other descended. The miner stepped from one to the other, rather than waiting at a fixed rest, as they changed direction.

Rotary steam engines were found to be more suitable than beam engines because the steady speed of the heavy flywheel gave a predictable pause between reversals of direction, whereas pistons acting directly on the rods, even when controlled by a cataract governor, could surprise the passenger by irregular waits, longer or shorter. In Cornwall only the Wheal Reeth man engine, Godolphin, (where a pumping engine was converted to this new use) was powered by a piston acting directly on the rods. When not in use for the man engine, it was an advantage that a rotary engine could also be used to power a whim.

== History ==
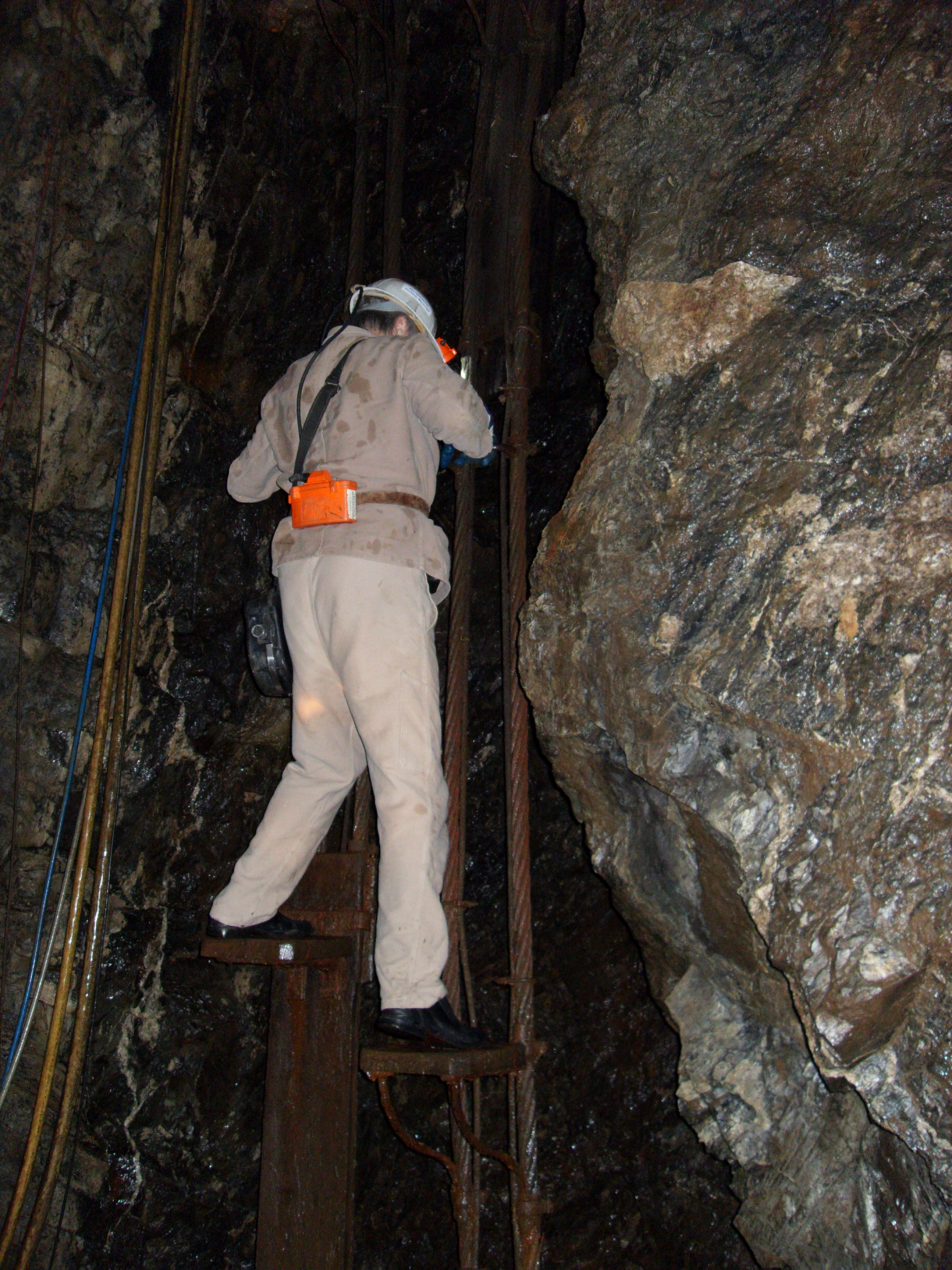
Person on the 1837 man engine at the Samson Pit in Lower Saxony, Germany

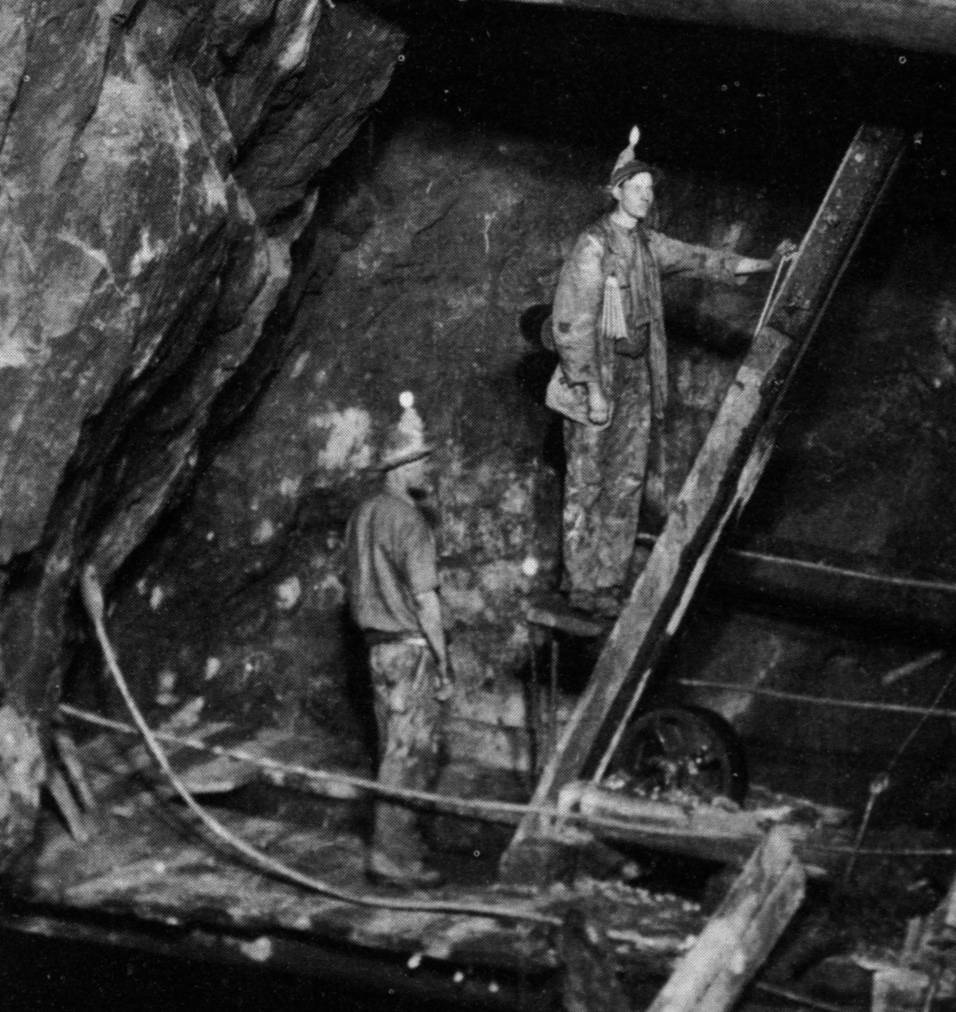
Bottom of the man engine at the Dolcoath Mine, Cornwall

The earliest known examples of this device were from the first half of the nineteenth century in the silver mining area of the Harz mountains, Germany, where they were driven by cranks connected to water wheels, although bucket hoists ("Hakenkunst") using the same method of operation had been used in Swedish iron mines since the 17th century. They appear to have evolved from an informal modification to the beam pumps, where the miners used spikes stuck into the wooden pump rods to get themselves carried up the shaft. As beam pumps were universal in deep mines, it was a then simple development to make proper platforms to carry the miners. The first formal engine was installed in 1833 at a mine at Clausthal, Lower Saxony, where inspector Wilhelm Albert and manager Georg Dörell fastened foot platforms and hand-holds to adjacent, reciprocating pump rods, using a waterwheel-driven pump put out of use when a new drainage adit was made at a lower level. The 1837 man engine at the Samson Pit in Sankt Andreasberg in the same region is still in use, although converted from water to electric power in 1922.

The device was introduced to Cornwall in January 1842, following the award of a premium for the best design, by the Royal Cornwall Polytechnic Society. The winner, Michael Loam, built one for the proprietors of the Tresavean Mine, in Lanner near Redruth. He used a double-rod design, driven by a waterwheel. In October of that year Loam proposed that the water wheel be replaced by a steam engine. A 36-inch (91 cm) bore, 6-foot (1.8 m) stroke, double-action steam engine was employed, through reduction spur gearing of 5:1. At the same time the stroke of the man-engine beams was increased from 6 feet to 12. Coal consumption was 24 hundredweight (1,200 kg) per day; the engine was in use for only six hours a day, but the boiler was kept at operating temperature continuously. The miners' journey time (in either direction) was reduced from about an hour to twenty-four minutes and output per shift increased by one fifth.

More than a dozen examples were installed in Cornish mines by the end of the century, but these were usually of the single-rod type, which was perceived as safer in use. When cable operated winding gear became available the man engines continued in use, particularly in cases where the mineshaft was not truly vertical and winding engines drawing suspended cages could not be used; with the provision of a few well-placed rollers, and “fend offs” mounted on trunnions, the rods could reach the bottom of a shaft even at a substantial deviation from the vertical. Economics also played a part: the rods needed for pumping could be used for this extra function at little increased cost. Even when skips or kibbles were used in such shafts, (running on "skipways") the tipping motion would make them impractical for carrying men.

== Safety ==
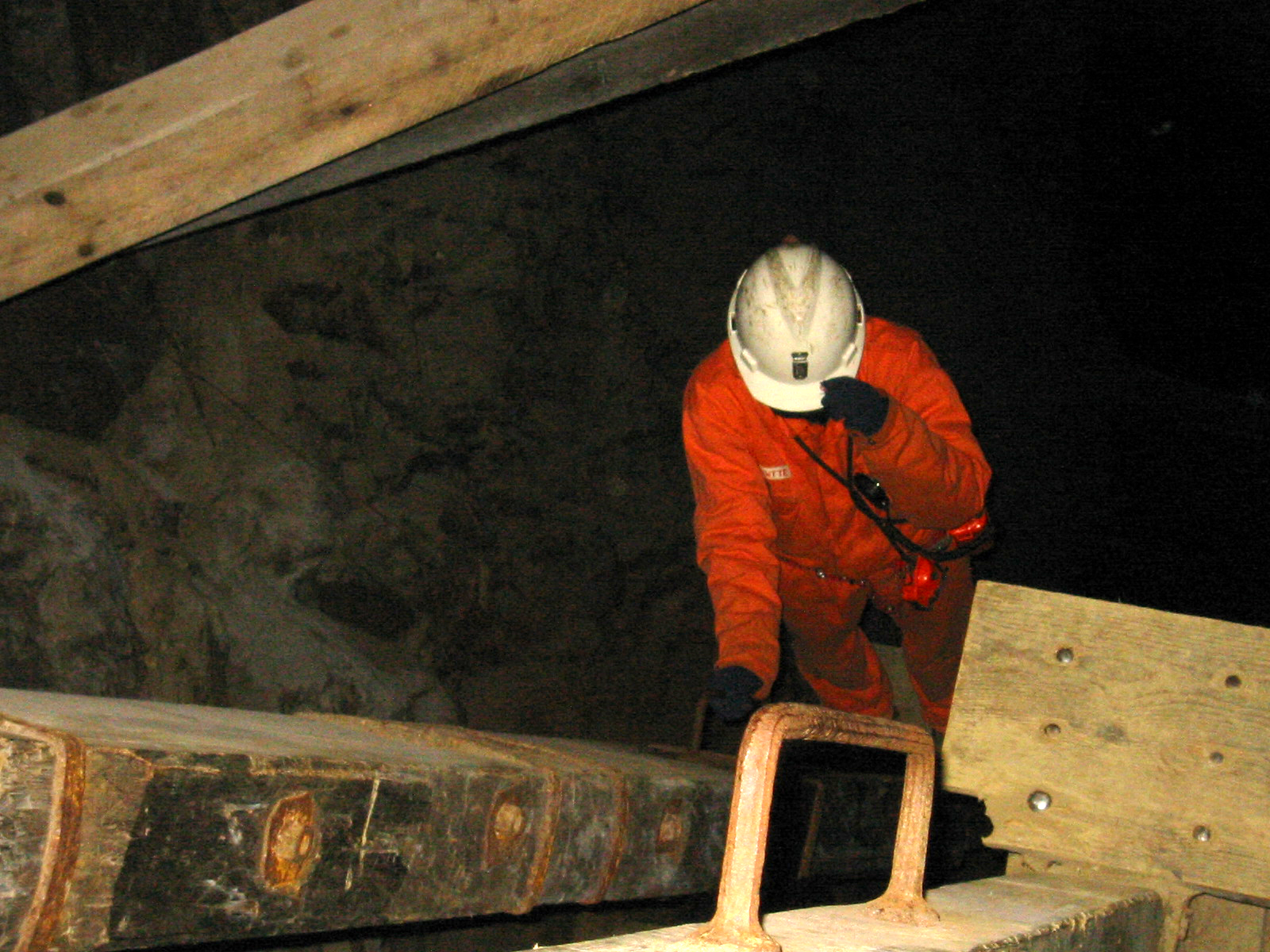
Twin-rod engine installed at the Kongens Gruve, Kongsberg, Norway

The miners took to these devices without hesitation as their pay was not calculated until they had reached their underground workplace. Contemporary safety studies concluded that, although intrinsically dangerous, the use of a man engine was in practice safer than climbing long ladders: it was less risky to be carried up at the end of a hard shift than to climb a ladder and risk falling because of exhaustion. In some mines, particularly in Germany, wedges or collars placed just above close-fitting rollers, or chains, were installed to limit any drop should a breakage occur.

=== Levant mine accident ===
In the afternoon of 20 October 1919, an accident occurred on the man engine at the Levant Mine, St Just, Cornwall. More than 100 miners were on the engine being drawn to the surface when a metal bracket at the top of the rod broke. The heavy timbers crashed down the shaft, carrying the side platforms with them, and 31 men died. The topmost safety cross-piece attached to the rod, which should have caught on a fixed ledge (the "sill") in case of its dropping too far, fell out of alignment because of the breakage and failed to engage. The man engine was not replaced and the lowest levels of the mine were abandoned.

== See also ==
- Flatrod system
- Belt manlift
- Paternoster lift
