= Bahlsen =

German food company

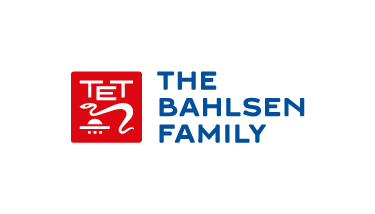
Logo

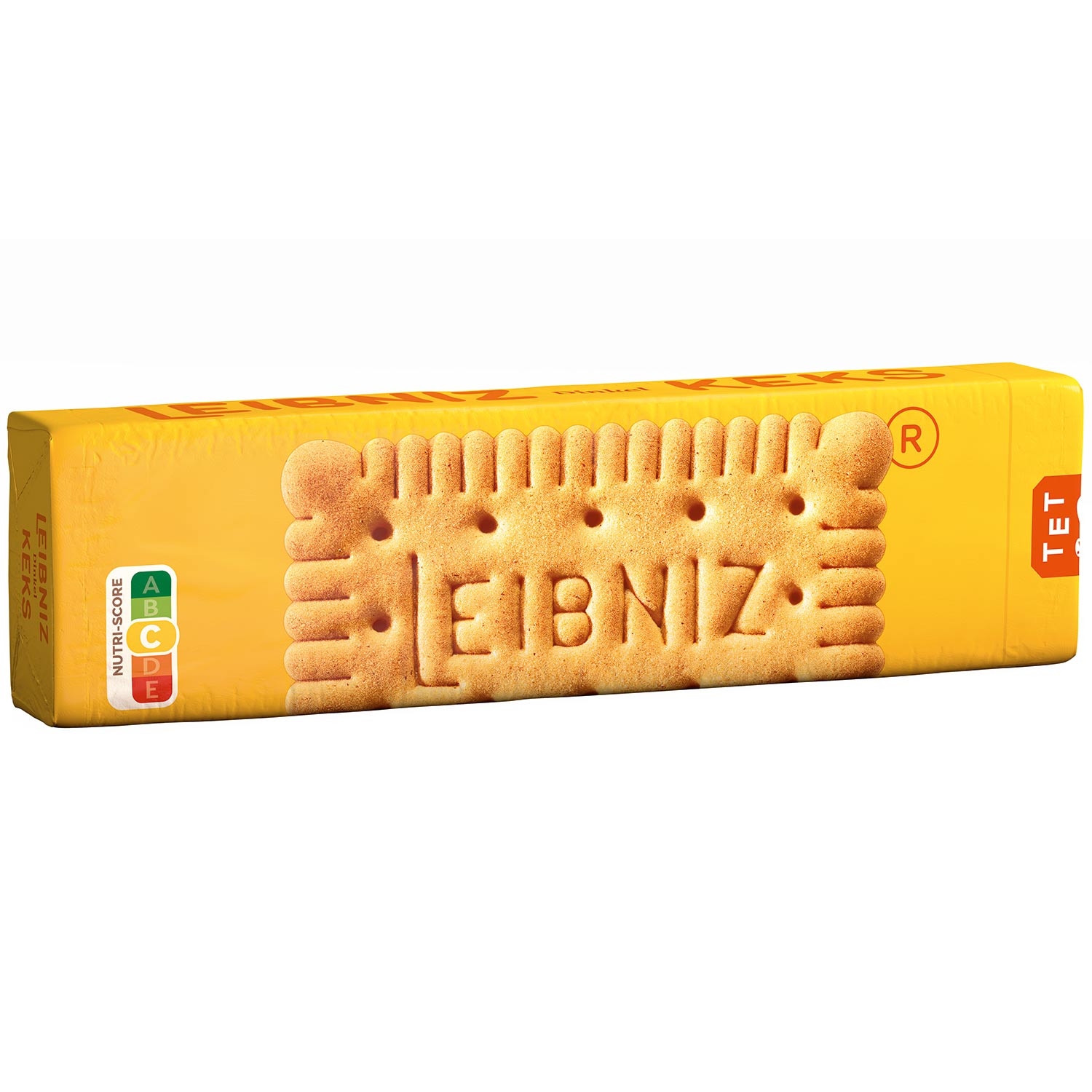
Leibniz Keks

Bahlsen GmbH & Co. KG is a German food company based in Hanover. It was founded in July 1889 by Hermann Bahlsen (1859–1919) as the "Hannoversche Cakesfabrik H. Bahlsen".

Bahlsen makes products such as chocolate-dipped Pick Up! snack bars. Bahlsen operates five production facilities in Europe and exports products to about 55 countries. It also does private-label production and remains funded by private capital.

== History ==
=== Origin and economic success ===
In 1889, the Hannoversche Cakesfabrik (Hanover Cake Factory) was founded by taking over Fabrikgeschäft engl. Cakes und Biscuits (factory business english cakes and biscuits), which had ten employees at the time. In 1891, the Leibniz biscuit was invented and by 1894 it was also produced in the United States. In 1893, Bahlsen received a gold medal for its products at the food exhibition in Brussels, and in the same year it was awarded a gold medal for its biscuits at the World's Columbian Exposition in Chicago.

In 1899, the company had 300 employees, and in 1905 the first assembly line production took place in Europe. In 1911, an administration building was built on Podbielskistrasse. In 1912, the company was renamed H. Bahlsens Keksfabrik. In 1914, Bahlsen employed around 1,700 people.

In 1911 Hermann Bahlsen changed the English word "cakes" into "Keks". Some years later, the new term is officially approved and incorporated in the German Duden (dictionary).

In 1916 and 1917, Bahlsen had plans developed for a test-tube city called TET-Stadt in Hanover, which was never realized. It was to be both a home and a workplace for the employees of the Bahlsen works.

On 6 November 1919, Hermann Bahlsen died and Hans Bahlsen took over the company.

=== During National Socialism in Germany (Until 1945) ===
The time of the German Reich was accompanied by economic success for Bahlsen. In particular, the Express tin can introduced in 1933, which contained a pound (500g) of biscuits for one Reichsmark, became a bestseller. In 1935, Bahlsen launched the saltstick, which had only been available in the United States until then. In 1935, the company planned to print a photo of Adolf Hitler on promotional postcards, to be paired with TET biscuit packs “for our propaganda purposes” (as a form of advertising). The Interior Ministry withdrew the cards because it would commercialize Hitler.

As a result of the shortage of raw materials due to World War II, the product range was reduced to eleven items. When Bahlsen was declared a "war-critical company" and thus an armaments company, it produced emergency rations for German soldiers and produced crispbread and rusks.

From the end of May 1940 until the end of the Second World War, over 800 forced labourers from various European countries, most of them women from the occupied zones of Poland and the Ukraine, came to the factory in Hanover. Due to the regulations at the time, they were disadvantaged in terms of pay, among other things, but also lagged behind the German workforce on other levels. 60 compensation claims by former forced labourers against Bahlsen were dismissed by the Hanover Regional Court in 2000 due to the statute of limitations. The company executives at the time, Hans Bahlsen, Werner Bahlsen and Klaus Bahlsen, were all members of the NSDAP. While the Bahlsen brothers were not top representatives of the NSDAP (Nazi party), they were in regular contact with NSDAP officials.

In addition, Bahlsen cooperated with the SS and managed a biscuit factory in occupied Kiev. During the German retreat in 1943, the Bahlsen company took all of the factory's equipment, facilities and materials with them to Germany.

After the end of the Nazi dictatorship, the company quickly received a production permit as an indispensable food producer and regained its role and importance. By the end of the war nearly 60% of the factory and almost all distribution warehouses were destroyed. In 2019 Bahlsen assigned historian Professor Dr. Manfred Grieger to examine an independent review of the company's history.

In 2019, criticism was voiced against company heiress and shareholder Verena Bahlsen after she commented in the Bild newspaper on forced labourers during Second World War: "That was before my time and we paid the forced labourers the same as the Germans and treated them well." Research by the weekly newspaper Die Zeit revealed that the statement about the amount of forced labourers' pay was incorrect. The average gross weekly wage of a German worker at the time was 44 Reichsmarks. According to an analysis of Bahlsen pay cards, the Bahlsen forced labourers were paid only five to ten Reichsmarks per week.

The company responded to the criticism in 2019 with a press release from the company's perspective on the time of the German Reich. In it, it published a statement by Verena Bahlsen in which she regretted her statements "in personal words". It was also announced that the historian Manfred Grieger had been commissioned with an independent panel of experts to write a scientifically based company history, including on forced labour at Bahlsen. The study by Hartmut Berghoff and Manfred Grieger was published in 2024. According to the results, more than 800 foreign workers were forced to work for Bahlsen between 1940 and 1945. This meant that the company profited from the National Socialist forced labour system. The hourly wage was a third to a fifth lower than that of German workers. Forced labourers from Poland had to wear a stigmatizing badge, received smaller food rations and poorer medical care. They were housed in a barracks camp and excluded from public life. Compared to other Hanoverian companies, such as Hanomag and Continental, the forced labourers at Bahlsen had better opportunities to obtain food. They also had access to wash rooms and showers because of the compliance with hygiene standards in the biscuit factory. After the new research results were announced, the Bahlsen family of manufacturers admitted shortcomings in dealing with the time during the German Reich. They expressed their regret at the lack of reappraisal and announced the company's commitment to the culture of remembrance. This includes a memorial plaque and an exhibition with documents from the Nazi era in the company headquarters on Podbielskistrasse. Cooperation is planned for the Käthe Kollwitz School's history projects on the Bahlsen forced labourers. The forced labourers' barracks camp was on the school grounds. A memorial plaque or monument is to be erected there.

=== After the Second World War ===
In 1945, about 60% of the factory was destroyed. In 1963, the Munich-based manufacturer Feurich-Keks was taken over. The company also acquired a stake in the Wilhelm Liebelt company in Hamburg and started selling nuts. Since 1964, Bahlsen has cooperated with Flessner KG, which had operated the first automatic production plant for potato chips in Europe since 1951. In 1985, Flessner was completely taken over by Bahlsen.

In 1965, Bahlsen took over the Kuchenfabrik Brokat (Cake factory Brokat) in Oldenburg, which was sold to an American company in 1991. In 1968, the Gubor chocolate factory in the Black Forest was taken over.

German politician Ernst Albrecht (1930–2014) was member of the management board of Bahlsen in the 1970s and the press gave him the nickname "Cookie Monster". During this time, Bahlsen developed into an international company and increasingly set up sales companies and distribution warehouses in other European countries, for example in 1972, in Spain and the United Kingdom. In 1980, the Austin Quality Foods Company in Cary, North Carolina, was taken over and production began in the USA. In 1987, production at the main plant in Hanover was discontinued and relocated to the nearby town of Barsinghausen. In 1989, the company celebrated its centenary with a "selection of the finest chocolate-coated biscuits and waffles". Since the 1990s, Bahlsen has also produced in Poland.

After the reunification of Germany (3 October 1990), the Treuhandanstalt privatized many formerly "publicly owned" companies. Bahlsen bought Dauerbackwaren GmbH in Radebeul, Saxony, but closed the plant in 1992/1993. In 1991, Bahlsen also bought the Erste Thüringer Keksfabrik (First Thuringia Biscuit Factory) in Bad Liebenstein, Thuringia.

Between 1996 and 1999, the company was owned equally by the three shareholders Werner Michael Bahlsen, Lorenz Alexander Bahlsen, the later founder of The Lorenz Bahlsen Snack-World, and Andrea von Nordeck († 1998). In 1999 the company is split off into the three segments, “sweet” (Bahlsen) and “snack” (Lorenz Bahlsen Snack Gruppe, renamed Lorenz Snack-World in 2001) and the real estate focused Von Nordeck-Gruppe.

In 2002, a two-brand strategy was created; in addition to the well-known company logo, two new logos were developed and introduced for the two product brands Bahlsen and Leibniz. In 2011, the factory in Barsinghausen was named "Factory of the Year 2011" by the magazine Produktion after extensive renovation. In 2018, after more than 80 years, a statue by Bernhard Hoetger depicting the TET goddess, which had been hidden since the 1930s, was found and reinstalled at the Bahlsen headquarters in Hanover. As of 2024, production took place at five locations, in Hanover, Barsinghausen, Varel (Friesland), Berlin, Skawina (Poland) and Jawornik (Poland).

From 1999 to 2018, Werner Michael Bahlsen was the sole shareholder and at the same time managing director. Today he is the chairman of the board of directors. CEO Phil Rumbol, who has been with the company since 2020 and was responsible for the company's reorientation, left the company in 2022. As an interim solution, a management team took over, which also included Werner M. Bahlsen's daughter, Verena Bahlsen. Alexander Kühnen took over the position of CEO on 1 January 2023.

=== Biscuit theft ===
In February 2013, a gilded bronze sign in the form of a biscuit that hung outside the corporate headquarters in Hanover was stolen overnight. The biscuit was around 20 kilograms in weight and created by sculptor Georg Herting together with the facade figures in 1910. A ransom demand was received asking for donations of cookies to a local children's hospital and a donation to a local animal shelter. The letter included a photo of an unknown person in a Cookie Monster costume posing with the biscuit. Bahlsen then offered via Facebook to donate 52,000 biscuit packs to 52 social institutions. On 5 February, the gold-plated biscuit was found again. It was hanging on the statue of the Saxon Steed in front of the Leibniz University in Hanover.

The company as well as the blackmailers used the symbolism of the company's founding Leibniz biscuit with 52 teeth (52,000 biscuit packages, 52 social institutions, returned on 5 February), which, like the place where it was found (Leibniz University), is named after the Hanover court librarian Gottfried Wilhelm Leibniz. On 11 July 2013, the biscuit was hung up at the headquarters again.

== Notable brands and adverts ==
=== Leibniz cakes ===
Bahlsen produces a range of biscuits and cakes. Its best-known product is the Leibniz-Keks (butter biscuit), introduced in 1891 and named after the Hanoverian court librarian and philosopher Gottfried Wilhelm Leibniz (1646–1716), who was looking for a long-lasting product to feed soldiers and came across rusks. The advertising slogan for the butter biscuits in 1898 was: "What does humanity eat on the move? Of course Leibniz Cakes!”

=== TET trademark ===
In 1904, the prancing horse, which had been registered as a trademark since 1896, was replaced by the TET symbol designed by the graphic artist Heinrich Mittag. In the same year Bahlsen introduced the new dust and moisture-resistant TET packaging onto the market. The TET sign, featuring an oval with a snake and three dots deriving from an ancient Egypt hieroglyphic meaning ‘everlasting’, is originally pronounced as “dshet”, but simplified to “TET”. The TET-packaging is the first packaging made of paper-board with the ability to keep the biscuit enduringly fresh. The following year Bahlsen introduces Europe's first assembly line.

=== Advertising stamps (1912-1914) ===
From 1912 to 1914 Bahlsen issued artistic advertising stamps. There were a total of eight series of stamps designed by various artists, such as Heinrich Vogeler, Otto Obermeier and Änne Koken, who designed two series. Other artists featured on Bahlsen's advertising stamps were Karl Bernhard, Heinrich Mittag and Lucian Bernhard.

The main character and narrator of Änne Kokens stamps is a winged putto. The stamps in the series show the necessary ingredients, manufacturing and packaging process for the distribution of the product. The advertising stamps were sent to customers in exchange for vouchers that were included in the biscuit packages. Twelve artist stamps were available for twelve vouchers.

=== Field postcards (1914-1916) ===
During the First World War, Bahlsen issued a total of 64 field postcards. The company was able to hire these artists for the postcards: Änne Koken (3), Ferdinand Spiegel (3), Walter Georgi (25), Josse Goossens (16), Ludwig Hohlwein (9), Carl Otto Czeschka (6) and Julius Diez (2).

== Key personnel ==
Management board:

- Alexander Kühnen (CEO)
- Christopher Harmsen (CFO)
- Cornelia Kaufmann (Chief Culture Officer)
- Karl Reichstein (Chief Supply Chain Officer)

== See also ==
- Theft of the golden Leibniz cookie
