= Leibnitz (disambiguation) =

Leibnitz is a town in Styria, Austria.

Leibnitz may also refer to:

== Places ==
- Leibnitz (crater), a lunar crater
- Leibnitz District, Styria, Austria
- Leibnitz, a parish in Westmoreland County, New South Wales

== People ==
- Gottfried Wilhelm Leibniz (1646–1716), German polymath
- Wolfgang Leibnitz (born 1936), German classical pianist

== See also ==
- Leibniz (disambiguation)
