= Walter Georgi =

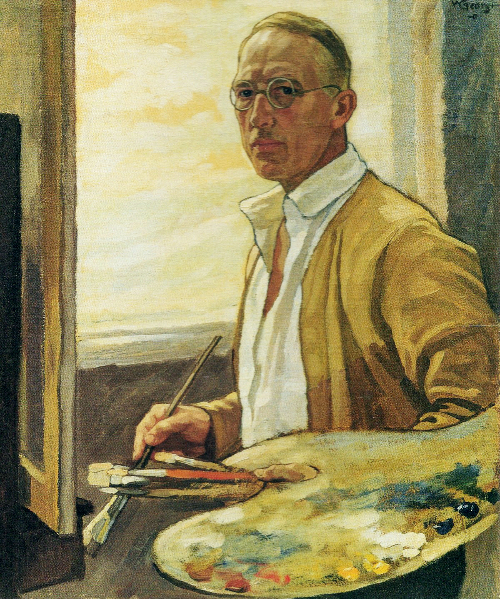
Self-portrait (1900)

Walter Georgi (10 April 1871, Leipzig – 17 June 1924, Utting am Ammersee) was a German painter and illustrator; known for his female portraits.

== Life and work ==
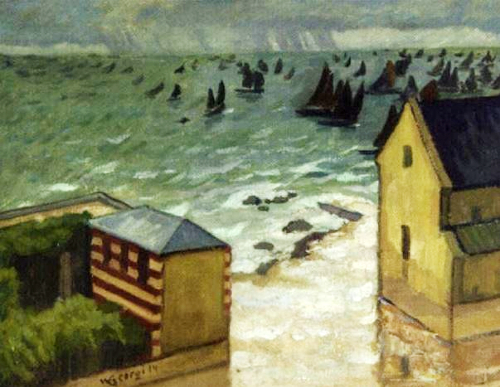
Storm on the Coast of Brittany

His father, the jurist Otto Georgi, was elected Mayor of Leipzig when Walter was five years old. From 1882 to 1888, he attended the König-Albert-Gymnasium. In 1890, he took lessons at the local Academy of Fine Arts, then transferred to the Dresden Academy of Fine Arts, where he studied with Leon Pohle. Finally, in 1893, he enrolled at the Academy of Fine Arts, Munich. His primary instructor there was Paul Hoecker.

After 1896, he was a staff member at the weekly art journal, Jugend, and the satirical magazine, Simplicissimus. In 1899, he was part of a group that established an artists' association called "Die Scholle", an agricultural term that often means "homeland", but they denied any patriotic intent. Later, they would have several exhibits at the Glaspalast.

Following stays in Leipzig, Weimar and Düsseldorf, he finally settled in Holzhausen am Ammersee, where other members of Die Scholle soon established an art colony. In 1908, he was awarded a professorship at the Academy of Fine Arts, Karlsruhe, which he retained until 1919. His students included Eva Eisenlohr, from Freiburg.

He was also a member of the Deutschen Künstlerbund. In 1912, he joined the Deutscher Werkbund and, in 1914, made several painting expeditions to Brittany. During that same period, he designed twenty-five postcards for the Bahlsen Family baking company. He died at the age of fifty-three, at his home in Holzhausen.

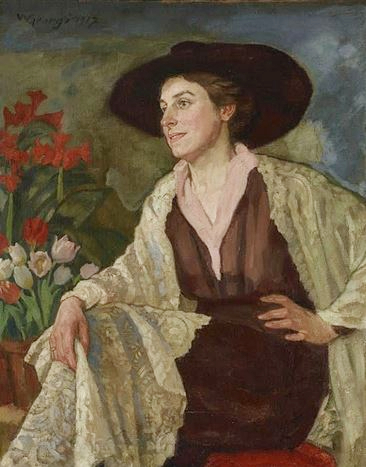
Lady in a Hat
