= List of things named after Gottfried Leibniz =

Gottfried Wilhelm Leibniz (1646–1716) was a German philosopher and mathematician.

In engineering, the following concepts are attributed to Leibniz:

- Leibniz wheel, a cylinder used in a class of mechanical calculators
- Leibniz calculator, a digital mechanical calculator based on the Leibniz wheel

In mathematics, several results and concepts are named after Leibniz:

- Leibniz algebra, an algebraic structure
  - Dual Leibniz algebra
- Madhava–Leibniz series
  - Leibniz formula for π, an inefficient method for calculating π
- Leibniz formula for determinants, an expression for the determinant of a matrix
- Leibniz harmonic triangle
- Leibniz integral rule, a rule for differentiation under the integral sign
  - Leibniz–Reynolds transport theorem, a generalization of the Leibniz integral rule
- Leibniz's linear differential equation, a first-order, linear, inhomogeneous differential equation
- Leibniz's notation, a notation in calculus
- Leibniz operator, a concept in abstract logic
- Leibniz law, see product rule of calculus
- Leibniz rule, a formula used to find the derivatives of products of two or more functions
  - General Leibniz rule, a generalization of the product rule
- Leibniz's test, also known as Leibniz's rule or Leibniz's criterion
- Newton–Leibniz axiom

In philosophy, the following concepts are attributed to Leibniz:

- Leibniz's gap, a problem in the philosophy of mind
- Leibniz's law, an ontological principle about objects' properties

Additionally, the following are named after Leibniz:

- 5149 Leibniz, an asteroid
- Gottfried Wilhelm Leibniz Bibliothek in Hanover, Germany
- Gottfried Wilhelm Leibniz Prize, a German research prize
- Leibnitz, a lunar crater
- The Leibniz Association, a union of German research institutes
- The Leibniz Review, a peer-reviewed academic journal devoted to scholarly examination of Gottfried Leibniz's thought and work
- Leibniz University of Hannover, a German university
- Leibniz Institute of Agricultural Development in Transition Economies, a research institute located in Halle (Saale)
- Leibniz Institute for Astrophysics Potsdam, a German research institute in the area of astrophysics
- Leibniz institute for molecular pharmacology, a research institute in the Leibniz Association
- Leibniz Institute for Science and Mathematics Education at Kiel University, a scientific institute in the field of Education Research
- Leibniz Institute for Solid State and Materials Research, a research institute in the Leibniz Association
- Leibniz Society of North America, a philosophical society whose purpose is to promote the study of the philosophy of Gottfried Wilhelm Leibniz
- Leibniz-Keks, a German brand of biscuit, although the only connection is that Leibniz lived in Hannover, where the manufacturer is based.
- Leibniz–Clarke correspondence, Leibniz' debate with the English philosopher Samuel Clarke
- Leibniz–Newton calculus controversy, the debate over whether Leibniz or Isaac Newton invented calculus
