= Julius Diez =

German artist (1870–1957)

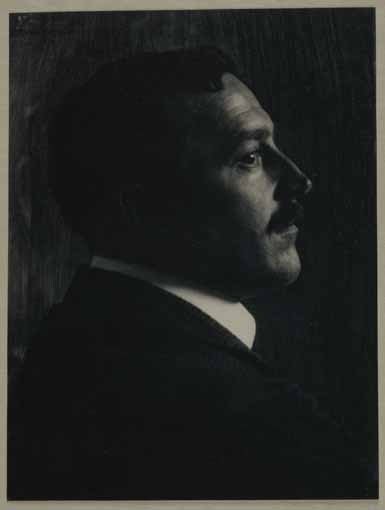
- Born: 18 September 1870; Nuremberg
- Died: 15 May 1957 (aged 86); Munich
- Occupation: Artist

Julius Diez (18 September 1870, Nuremberg – 15 May 1957, Munich) was a German artist, active in etching, drawing, painting, illustration, and graphic design.

Diez was born in Nuremberg and moved to Munich in 1888, to attend the School of Applied Art. He later taught there, and at the State Academy of Art. He was one of the first contributors to the magazine Jugend (Youth) after it was founded in 1896. He was co-founder and president of the Munich Secession movement.

In 1930, "monumental paintings" by Diez and others decorated the interior of the administration building of the Bahlsen factory in Hanover. In 1933, a painting by Diez titled "Paradise" was included in a show at the Nicholas Roerich Museum in New York City. He died in 1957, in Munich, at the age of 86, remembered as "one of the last painters and graphic artists whose creative work was still closely connected with Munich art life at the turn of the century".
