= Hartz =

Hartz is a surname, and may refer to:

- Donna Hartz, Aboriginal Australian midwife and academic
- Glenn A. Hartz, American philosopher
- Harris Hartz (born 1947), U.S. federal judge
- Harry Hartz (1896—1974), U.S. racecar driver
- Jim Hartz (1940–2022), U.S. television personality
- Louis Hartz (1919—1986), U.S. political scientist
- Nikolaj Hartz (1867—1937), Danish geologist and botanist
- Peter Hartz (born 1941), German business executive (Hartz concept)
- William J. Hartz, U.S. composer and lyricist

The corporate name may refer to:

- Hartz Mountain Industries, a real estate and pet product conglomerate

== See also ==
- Hartz Mountains (Tasmania)
- Harz Mountains (Germany)
