= Belt manlift =

Device for moving people between floors in a building

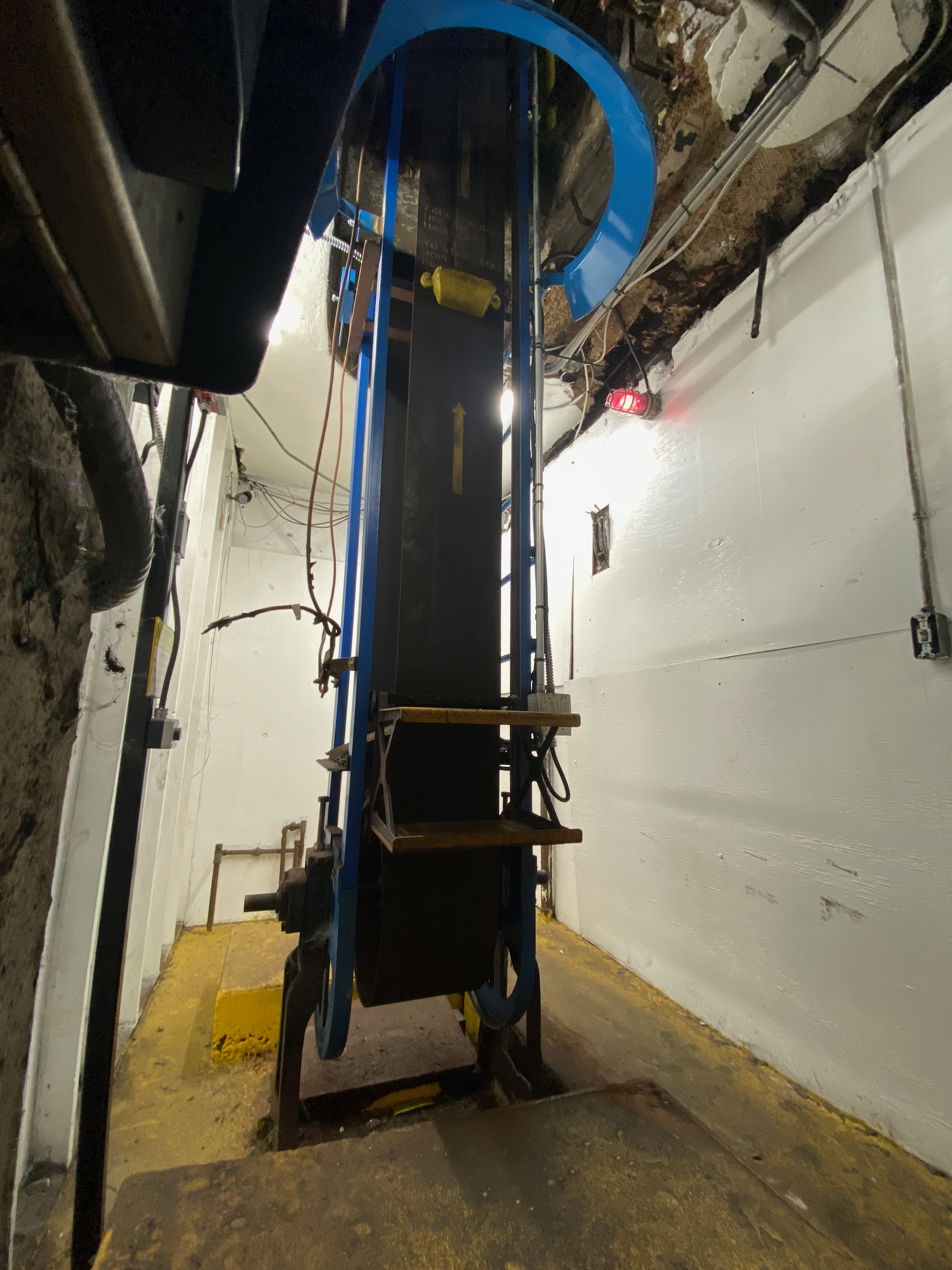
Belt manlift in a parking garage

A belt manlift, or manlift, is a device for moving passengers between floors of a building. It is a simple belt with platforms and handholds rather than an elevator with cars. Its design is similar to that of a paternoster lift. The belt is a loop that moves in a single direction, so one can go up or down by using the opposite sides of the loop. The belt moves continuously, so one can simply get on when a step passes and step off when passing any desired floor without having to call and wait for a car to arrive. A limit switch is triggered if a passenger fails to dismount at the top, which stops the belt.

Although not technically a paternoster, it has many of the same design features and hazards associated with its use. There are several companies still making belt manlifts. They are used in grain elevators and parking garages where space is limited. In Canada, manlifts were retrofitted in the early 1990s with safety features after fatal accidents. Safety concerns have led to a decline in their use.

== See also ==
- Man engine
