= Leibniz' law =

Leibniz' law may refer to:

- The product rule
- General Leibniz rule, a generalization of the product rule
- Identity of indiscernibles

== See also ==
- Leibniz (disambiguation)
- Leibniz's rule (disambiguation)
