= Paternoster lift =

Type of elevator

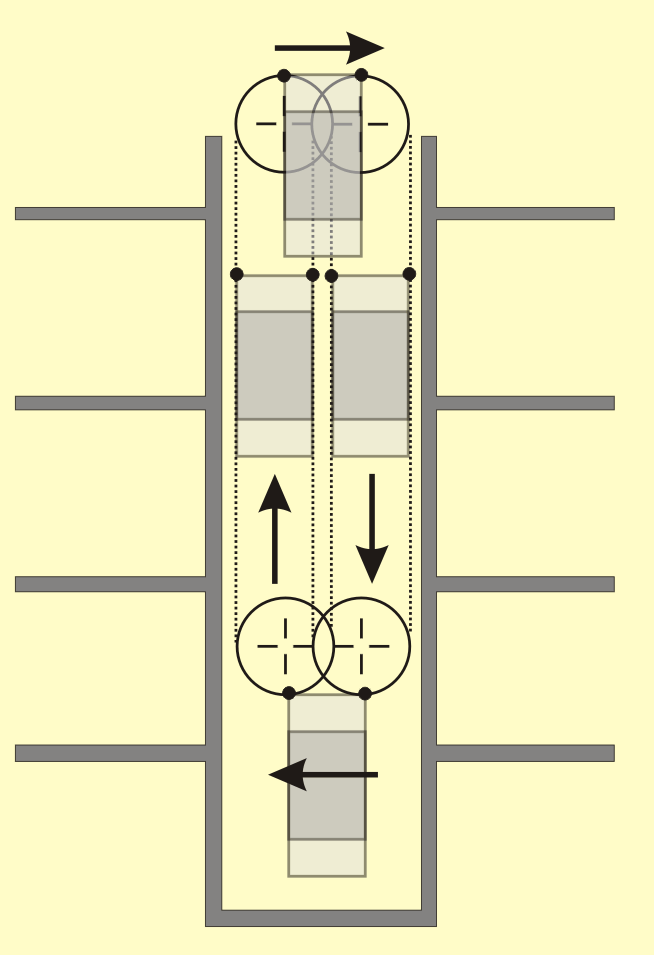

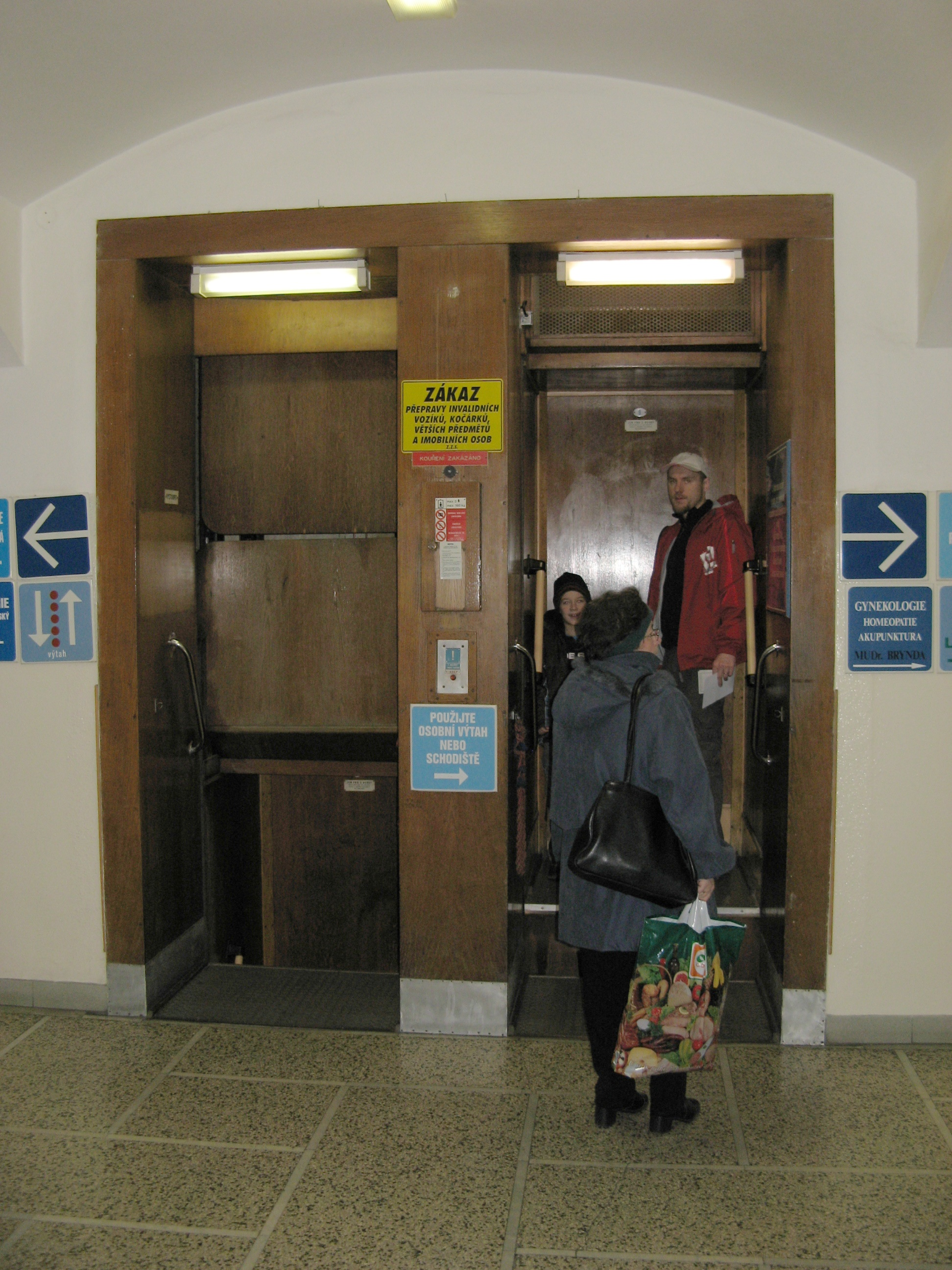
A paternoster in Prague

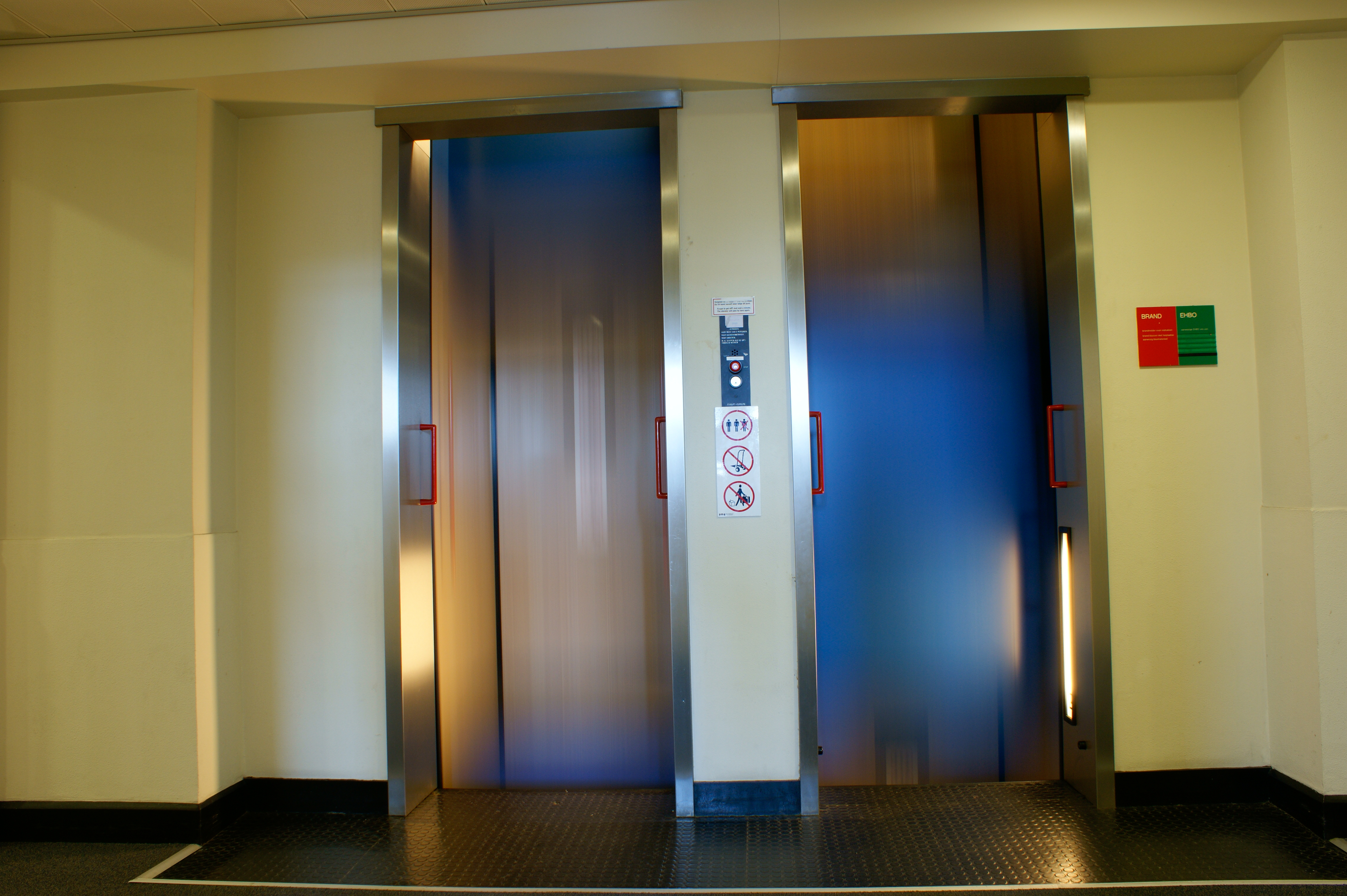
Paternoster elevator in The Hague, when it was still in operation

A paternoster (/ˌpeɪtərˈnɒstər/, /ˌpɑː-/, or /ˌpæ-/) or paternoster lift is a passenger elevator, consisting of a chain of open compartments, each usually designed for two people, that move slowly in a loop up and down inside a building without stopping. Passengers can step on or off at any floor.

The same technique is also used for filing cabinets to store documents or for small spare parts, as well as for carpet and vinyl roll, or tyres, in storage/display/dispensing machines. The smaller belt manlift, consisting of an endless belt with steps and rungs, but no compartments, is also sometimes called a paternoster.

The name paternoster ("Our Father", the first two words of the Lord's Prayer in Latin) was originally applied to the device because the elevator is in the form of a loop and is thus similar to rosary beads used as an aid in reciting prayers.

Construction of paternosters was stopped in the mid-1970s out of concern for safety, but many examples remain. By far, most remaining paternosters are in Europe, with 230 examples in Germany and 68 in the Czech Republic. Only three have been identified outside Europe, one each in Malaysia, Sri Lanka and Peru.

== History ==
British architect Peter Ellis obtained a patent in July 1866 for "an improved lift, hoist, or mechanical elevator" with two shafts and subsequently installed the first elevators that could be described as paternoster lifts in Oriel Chambers in Liverpool in 1868. This patent lapsed in July 1873. Another was used in 1876 to transport parcels at the General Post Office in London. In 1878, British engineer Frederick Hart obtained a patent on the paternoster. In 1884, the engineering firm of J & E Hall of Dartford, Kent, installed its first "Cyclic Elevator", using Hart's patent, in a London office block, and the firm is generally considered the company first involved in regular construction of the lifts.

The newly built Dovenhof in Hamburg was inaugurated in 1886. The prototype of the Hamburg office buildings equipped with the latest technology also had a paternoster. This first system outside of Great Britain already had the technology that would later become common, but was still driven by steam power like the British systems.

The highest paternoster lift in the world was located in Stuttgart in the 16-floor Tagblatt tower, which was completed in 1927. This was replaced with conventional elevators in 1959.

Paternosters were popular throughout the first half of the 20th century because they could carry more passengers than ordinary elevators. They were more common in continental Europe, especially in public buildings, than in the United Kingdom. These elevators are relatively slow, typically traveling at about 20–45 centimetres per second (0.7–1.5 ft/s) to facilitate passengers embarking and disembarking.

== Safety ==
Paternoster elevators are intended only for transporting people. Accidents have occurred when they have been misused for transporting large items such as ladders or library trolleys. Their overall rate of accidents is estimated as 30 times higher than conventional elevators. A representative of the Union of Technical Inspection Associations stated that Germany saw an average of one death per year due to paternosters prior to 2002, at which point many of them were made inaccessible to the general public.

Because the accident risk is much greater than for conventional elevators, the construction of new paternosters is no longer allowed in many countries. In 2012, an 81-year-old man was killed when he fell into the shaft of a paternoster in the Dutch city of The Hague. Elderly people, disabled people and children are most vulnerable.

In September 1975, the paternoster in Newcastle University's Claremont Tower was temporarily taken out of service after a passenger was killed when a car left its guide rail at the top of its journey and forced the two cars ascending behind it into the winding room above. In October 1988, a second, non-fatal accident occurred in the same lift. A conventional lift replaced it in 1989–1990.

In West Germany, new paternoster installations were banned in 1974, and in 1994 there was an attempt to shut down all existing installations. However, there was a wave of popular resistance to the ban, and to a similar attempt in 2015, and as a result many are still in operation. As of 2015, Germany had 231 paternosters.

In April 2006, Hitachi announced plans for a modern paternoster-style elevator with computer-controlled cars and standard elevator doors to alleviate safety concerns. A prototype was revealed as of February 2013. In 2009, Solon received special permission to build a new paternoster in its Berlin headquarters.

== Surviving examples ==
=== Austria ===
- In Vienna, the Vienna City Hall, the Ringturm (headquarters of the Vienna Insurance Group), an office building at Trattnerhof 2 near Stephansplatz and Haus der Industrie on Schwartzenbergplatz have the last four running and frequently used paternosters in the city. The university also had one or more.
- In Klagenfurt, the Headquarters of the energy company Kelag still have one paternoster active for daily use.

=== Belgium ===
- A paternoster lift dating from 1958 survives in Avenue Fonsny 47, Brussels, a currently disused office building forming part of Midi/Zuid railway station.
- At the Huis van de Vlaamse Volksvertegenwoordigers (House of Flemish Representatives), previously the Postcheque Building, at Leuvenseweg/Rue de Louvain 86, the paternoster is operational but not used.

=== Czech Republic ===
- In Prague, New City Hall – an early 20th century paternoster renovated in 2017. The lift was temporarily closed in April 2023 due to misuse by tourists.
- In Prague, Czech Technical University – Faculty of Electrotechnical Engineering at Technická 2, Dejvice
- In Prague, Czech Technical University – Faculty of Mechanical Engineering at Technická 4, Dejvice
- In Prague, Charles University – Faculty of Law
- In Prague, Ministry of Transport (Czech Republic) head office
- In Prague, Ministry of Agriculture (Czech Republic)
- In Prague, Ministry of Foreign Affairs (Czech Republic) - head office at the Czernin Palace
- In Prague, General Financial Directorate at the former Mining and Metallurgical Company palace in Lazarská Street
- In Prague, Lucerna Palace (near the southeast entrance)
- In Prague, Czech Radio building (oldest paternoster lift in the Czech Republic, not publicly accessible)
- In Prague, YMCA building
- In Plzeň, municipal office – Škroupova 1900/5
- In Brno, Brno Technical University – Faculty of Mechanical Engineering at Technická 2896/2
- In Brno, municipal office – Malinovského Square 624/3
- In Most, Business centrum, tř. Budovatelů 2957
- In the offices of Czech Post at Brno railway station, (returned to use in 2013, after being out of service for six years)
- In Jablonec nad Nisou, city hall built in 1933
- In Ostrava, New City Hall built in 1930
- In Liberec, Liberec Regional Office building build in 1971, highest paternoster in the country (56.8 m high and has 35 wooden cabins)
- In Zlín, Baťa's Skyscraper or Building No. 21 built in 1938
- In Hradec Králové, EUC Clinic (used to be Polyclinic II), Bratří Štefanů 895/1, built in 1974

=== Denmark ===
- In the Christiansborg Palace where the Danish parliament resides
- At Vognmagergade 8. Today the building is used by KVUC – Københavns VUC (Copenhagen's adult-education center)
- In the corporate office building Axelborg, located in central Copenhagen
- In Frederiksberg Town Hall
- In the 11-story main administrative building at Danfoss headquarters on the island of Als
- In the hospital in Vejle
- In Sydvestjysk Hospital in Esbjerg
- In Regionshospitalet Randers

=== Finland ===
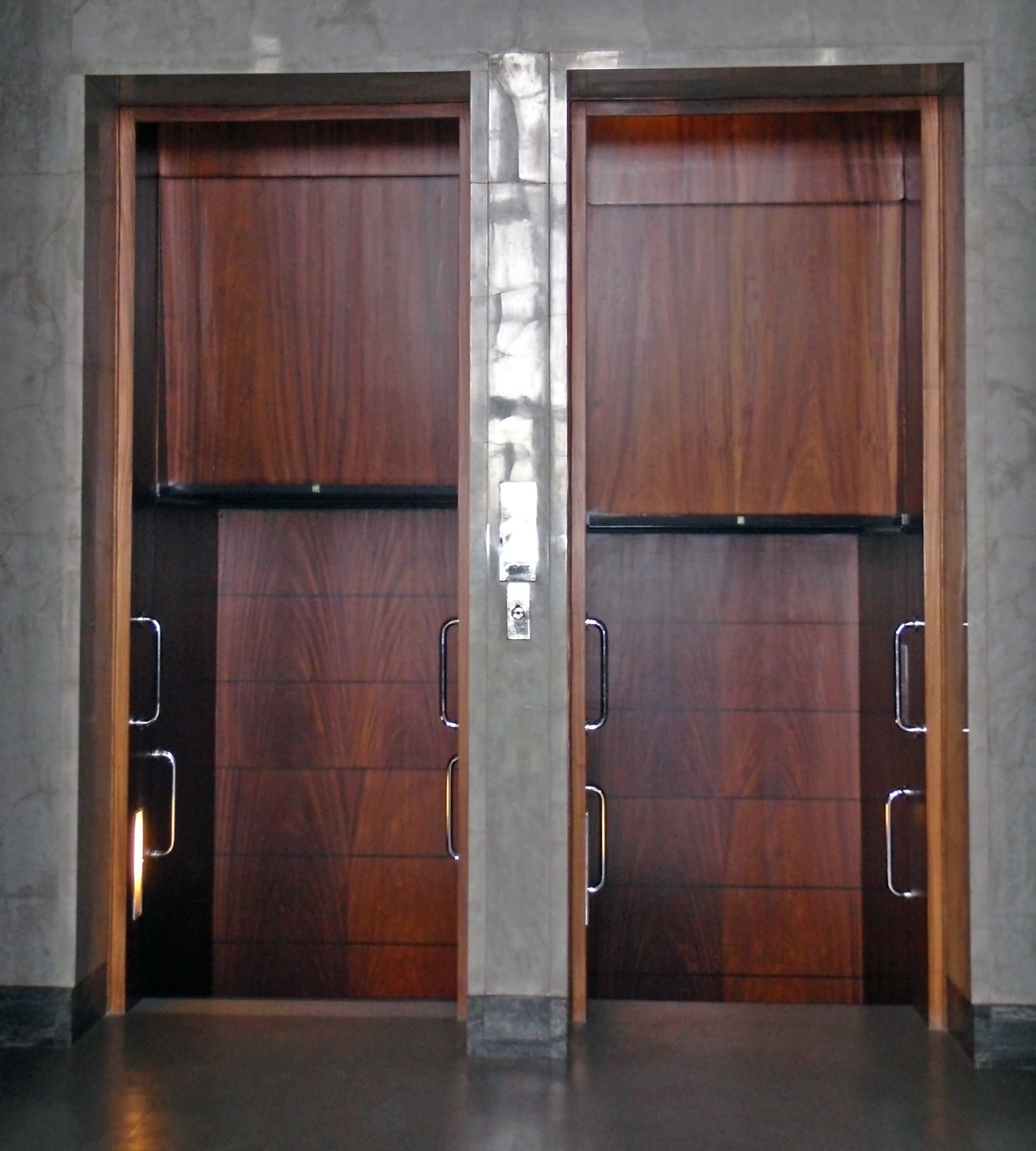
Paternoster lift at the Parliament House of Finland

The following locations have paternosters:

- In Turku, Town hall in Yliopistonkatu 27
- In Helsinki, in the office building at Hämeentie 11
- In Helsinki, in the office building at Hämeentie 19
- In Helsinki, at Eduskunta, the parliament of Finland at Mannerheimintie 30, accessible to staff only
- In Helsinki, in Stockmann, Helsinki centre at Aleksanterinkatu 52, accessible to staff only

=== Germany ===
A full ride in the paternoster of the State Parliament building in Kiel

- In Kiel, the Landeshaus Kiel (the State Parliament building for the state of Schleswig-Holstein) has had a working paternoster since 1950.
- In Kiel, the city hall has had a paternoster in use for over 100 years.
- In Berlin,
  - the offices of the alt-left newspaper Neues Deutschland contain a working paternoster (as of 2025), while those of the conservative tabloid Bild contain a 19-storey paternoster that is still in use but not open to the public. The Rathaus Schöneberg, including scenes with its paternoster elevator, were used to film the TV series Babylon Berlin.
  - the building at Kleiststr. 23–26 that houses Argentina's embassy contains an 8-story paternoster.
  - In the Axel-Springer-Hochhaus in Berlin paternosters are in use.
  - In the German Academy of Sciences in Berlin another paternoster is in use.
  - In the Siemens building in Berlin at Nonnendammallee 101 a paternoster is in use.
  - Berlin's Flughafen Tempelhof through at least 1967 (when it shared an identity as Tempelhof Air Base) had at least 1 fully-functional paternoster in the tower on the left end (as seen from the Luftbrückeplatz) of the quarter-circular pre-WW2 building.
  - The German Foreign Ministry in Berlin has a paternoster lift.
- Bremen has a paternoster in the Bremen Cotton Exchange, at Wachtstraße 17-24, just off the market square.
- In Hamburg, the building at 25 Deichstraße, Speicherstadt; the Bezirksamt at Grindelberg 62–66 in Eimsbüttel and Hapag Lloyd buildings in Balindamm street, the building at Stadthausbrücke 8, the Laeiszhof Building in Trostbrücke 1, and a hotel in Hannoversche Strasse 88a (Harburg, Hamburg) have Paternosters.
- In Cologne, the building at Hansaring 97 has a working and in-use paternoster. There is also an in-use paternoster at Schanzenstraße 28 in Mülheim.
- In Essen, the Deutschlandhaus in the inner city has a working and in-use paternoster.
- In Frankfurt, the former IG Farben Building has running and frequently used paternosters as seen in the movies Berlin Express (1948) and Night People (1954). Today, the IG Farben Building is used by Goethe University Frankfurt; the still in-use paternoster is now located in the humanities library.
- In Frankfurt the Flemings hotel has an operational paternoster.
- In Jena, a paternoster is in use at the headquarters of Jenapharm.
- In Kassel, a paternoster is still in use at the headquarters of Wintershall Dea
- In Lippstadt, a paternoster is still in use at the headquarter of Hella/Forvia.
- In Wiesbaden, a paternoster is still in use at the Federal Statistical Office of Germany.
- In Wetzlar, a paternoster is in use at the headquarters of Leica Microsystems
- In Stuttgart, a paternoster is still in use at city hall (Stuttgart Rathaus).
- In Leipzig, a paternoster is still in use at city hall (Leipzig Neues Rathaus)

=== Hungary ===
- Gottsegen National Cardiovascular Centre, Budapest.
- In Jahn Ferenc hospital in Budapest.
- In Miskolc, the University of Miskolc, has a working and in-use paternoster.
- In the central office of National Tax and Duty Administration Budapest.
- In the MVM building in Budapest.
- In the headquarters of BKV Budapesti Közlekedési Zrt. in Budapest. (operating in 2020)
- In the Ministry of Education in Budapest (operating and in daily use in March 2022).
- In Kiskun County Hospital, Kecskemét
- ELMŰ-székház (headquarters) (Váci út – Dráva u. corner, Budapest)
- Pesti Központi Kerületi Bíróság (Pest District Court) (Budapest, Markó utca 25.)
- Tőzsdepalota (formerly MTV-székház (headquarters)) (Budapest, Szabadság tér 17.)
- In Graboplast Zrt. (Győr, Fehérvári út 16/b)

=== Italy ===
- In Fiat's Head Office Building, Mirafiori, Turin (Torino) [as of 1985].

=== Netherlands ===
In the Netherlands, seven paternoster lifts could be found in 2012, some of which were still operational:

- In the former Ziggo building at Spaarneplein 2, The Hague: no longer in use. (Stork Hijsch 1922, conversion 1976 Starlift, damage repair 1999 Schindler.) On 13 April 2012, a fatal accident occurred when an 81-year-old man was trapped between the lift and the wall.
- At the Dudokhuis, Tata Steel Europe in IJmuiden: shut down in 1999. (Eggers Kehrhan, 1957):
- In the HaKa building (the old head office of the Coöperatieve Groothandelsvereniging 'de Handelskamer') on the Vierhavenstraat in Rotterdam. This 1936 Hensen-Schindler lift has been operational again since the end of 2011, although the building is empty. For safety reasons, the lift can only be visited with the building manager. The lift can be put into operation for interested parties on request.
- In the former tax office on Puntegaalstraat in Rotterdam; it is put into operation during Heritage Days, but may not be used. To enforce this, gates have been built across the entrances. (Backer and Rueb Breda, 1948, conversion December 1975 by De Reus BV.)
- In the former post office on the Coolsingel 42 in Rotterdam: disused.
- Two examples in the Scheepvaarthuis (now Grand Hotel Amrâth Amsterdam) in Amsterdam: one is still put into operation on Sundays only. (Roux Combaluzier, 1928.)
- In the old school building on the Mauritskade in Amsterdam: whether the elevator is still working is unknown. A working paternoster can be seen in the 1992 episode Still Waters of the television show Van der Valk.

=== Norway ===
- In Oslo, Landbrukets hus, on Schweigaards Gate. The building was built in 1965 as the headquarters for Norges Bondelag, who vacated it in 2016.

=== Poland ===
- Building of Silesian Parliament in Katowice.
- In Wrocław, Poland, Santander Bank building, Main Square. Available for employees only.
- In Opole, Poland, Urząd Wojewódzki building, Ostrówek.

=== Russia ===
- In the building of the Ministry of Agriculture in Moscow

=== Serbia ===
- In Belgrade in the headquarters building of Serbian Railways there is one operating paternoster lift and another one which is not in service.

=== Slovakia ===
- In Bratislava there are at least five operating paternosters: Ministry of Transport and Construction, Ministry of Interior, Ministry of Finance, Ministry of Agriculture and Rural Development and the headquarters of Railways of the Slovak Republic.
- In Košice, the Technical University of Košice operates a paternoster in the main building called L9 since 1972. There is another paternoster in an administrative building of U. S. Steel Košice, steel manufacturing company in Košice.

=== Sri Lanka ===
- Ceylon Electricity Board Headquarters building in Colombo

=== Sweden ===
- In Sweden there is at least one functional Paternoster lift at HSB-huset, Kungsholmen, Stockholm
- Mäster Samuelsgatan 56, in central Stockholm, houses a multi-floor Paternoster lift.

=== Ukraine ===
- One functional paternoster in the building of Zakarpattia Oblast Administration in Uzhhorod.

=== United Kingdom ===
Current

- The Arts Tower at the University of Sheffield has a paternoster, which is said to be the largest on Earth. It has 38 two-person cars and serves 22 storeys. A journey between two floors takes 13 seconds.
- The Albert Sloman Library at the University of Essex on the Colchester campus has a working paternoster which began operating in 1967. The lift was temporarily out of service for refurbishment between December 2019 and June 2021.
- Northwick Park Hospital in Harrow, North West London (part of the London North West University Healthcare NHS Trust) has the last working paternoster in London. It had been out of commission for many years until July 2020, when it was reopened for staff use.

Former

- Aston University in Birmingham was operating paternoster lifts in the main building. These are no longer in use, but one is remaining and is visible on the 4th floor of the south wing. The lift cars are covered with a perspex wall, and some visual displays explain the story and operation of the lift.
- On 8 December 2017 it was announced that the paternoster in the Attenborough tower at the University of Leicester which was constructed in 1968–1970 would be taken out of service as maintenance had become too expensive. This was undertaken shortly afterwards.
- De Montfort University in Leicester had two paternosters - one in the former Fletcher Building and one in the James Went Building. Both buildings have since been replaced.
- At the University of Birmingham, both the main library and the Muirhead Tower had paternosters. The library was demolished in 2017, and replaced with a new library. The paternoster in the Muirhead Tower was closed for many years before a major refurbishment added two new lifts.
- Birmingham Polytechnic (now Birmingham City University) had a paternoster in the 1970s in the Baker building on its City North Campus at Perry Barr. The building closed in 2018.
- Birmingham College of Food, Tourism & Creative Studies (now University College Birmingham), Summer Row, Birmingham
- St Thomas’s Hospital had a paternoster, for staff use only, in the North Wing building.
- Birmingham Dental School. The building was demolished during 2020–21.
- London School of Economics. The Clare Market Building had a paternoster until 1991.
- There was a paternoster in the Co-op's six-storey Fairfax House department store, in Bristol's Broadmead shopping centre. The store opened in March 1962 and was demolished in 1988.
- Leeds University in the Roger Stevens building (Lecture Theatre Block).
- Newcastle University's Claremont Tower paternoster had a fatal accident in September 1975 after a car left its guide rail at the top of its journey and forced the two cars ascending behind it into the winding room above. Another accident in 1988 led to its subsequent closure and removal.
- University of Glasgow. The Pontecorvo Building, which housed The Institute of Genetics, had a paternoster lift.
- Oxford University Department of Engineering Science. The Thom Building had a paternoster lift through into the 1980s, now replaced by a pair of conventional lifts.
- University of Salford Chemistry Tower had a paternoster lift. The building has been demolished.
- Risley, Cheshire – Former United Kingdom Atomic Energy Authority (UKAEA) site, now Birchwood Park Business Park. The original management block 'A Block', and the later engineering building 'E Block' had paternoster lifts. Those in the former E Block (Chadwick House) survived into the 21st century (sealed off), and still exist in place. The adjacent ‘Y Block’ also had two sets; these are also sealed off.
- UKAEA Winfrith Heath Dorset 4 floor Administration Building
- GEC-Marconi Ltd, Elstree Way, Borehamwood, Hertfordshire - a former research centre for defence software. The Paternoster lift was in use until 2001, when it was boarded up. The building and Paternoster lift were demolished in 2012. The lift appeared in the episode "Do Not Forsake Me Oh My Darling" of the 1967 British TV series "The Prisoner."
- BNFL Sellafield had a paternoster in its administration building B403. Demolished in 2002.
- Viscount House, a British Airways office building at Hatton Cross. During the early 1960s, the building was conjoined with the BEA apprentice school and was supposed to be out of bounds to students who naturally sought to explore the novelty of such ingenious technology. Your writer recalls the constant rumbling from the rollers and the abrupt stoppages triggered by deliberate attacks on the safety devices. Now demolished.
- Unipart House, Oxford, had two of them. They were at each end of the building but were taken out due to the cost of maintenance. Bob Geldof and The Boomtown Rats filmed their video of "Love or Something" in them.
- NatWest Bank at 55 King Street Manchester (opened in 1970 and vacated in 1998) had a paternoster over its 11 floors.

== Gallery ==
View of a working paternoster, Detlev-Rohwedder-Haus, Berlin

View from inside a working paternoster, Detlev-Rohwedder-Haus, Berlin

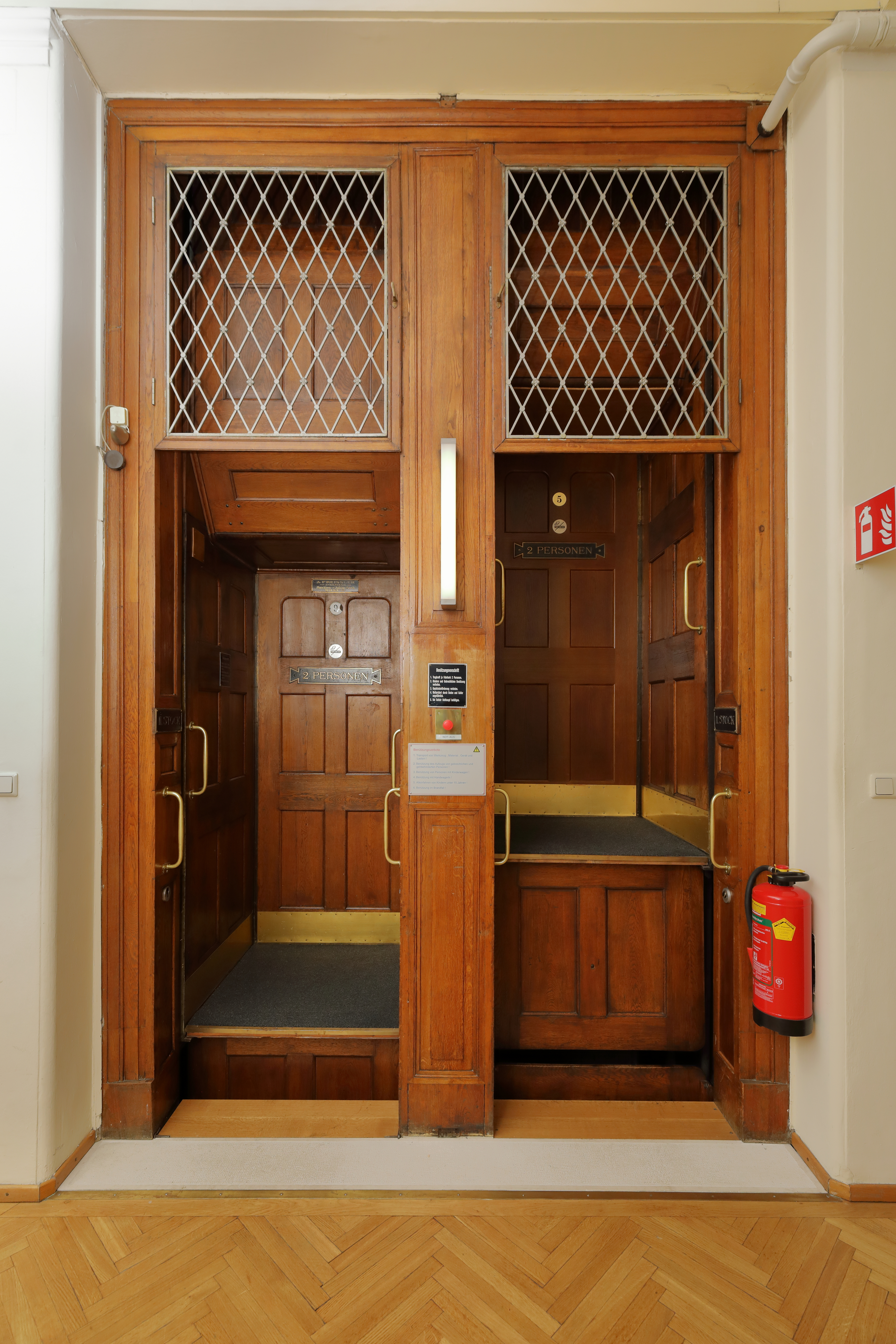
Paternoster in the House of Industry, Vienna (offices of the Federation of Austrian Industries), built c. 1910

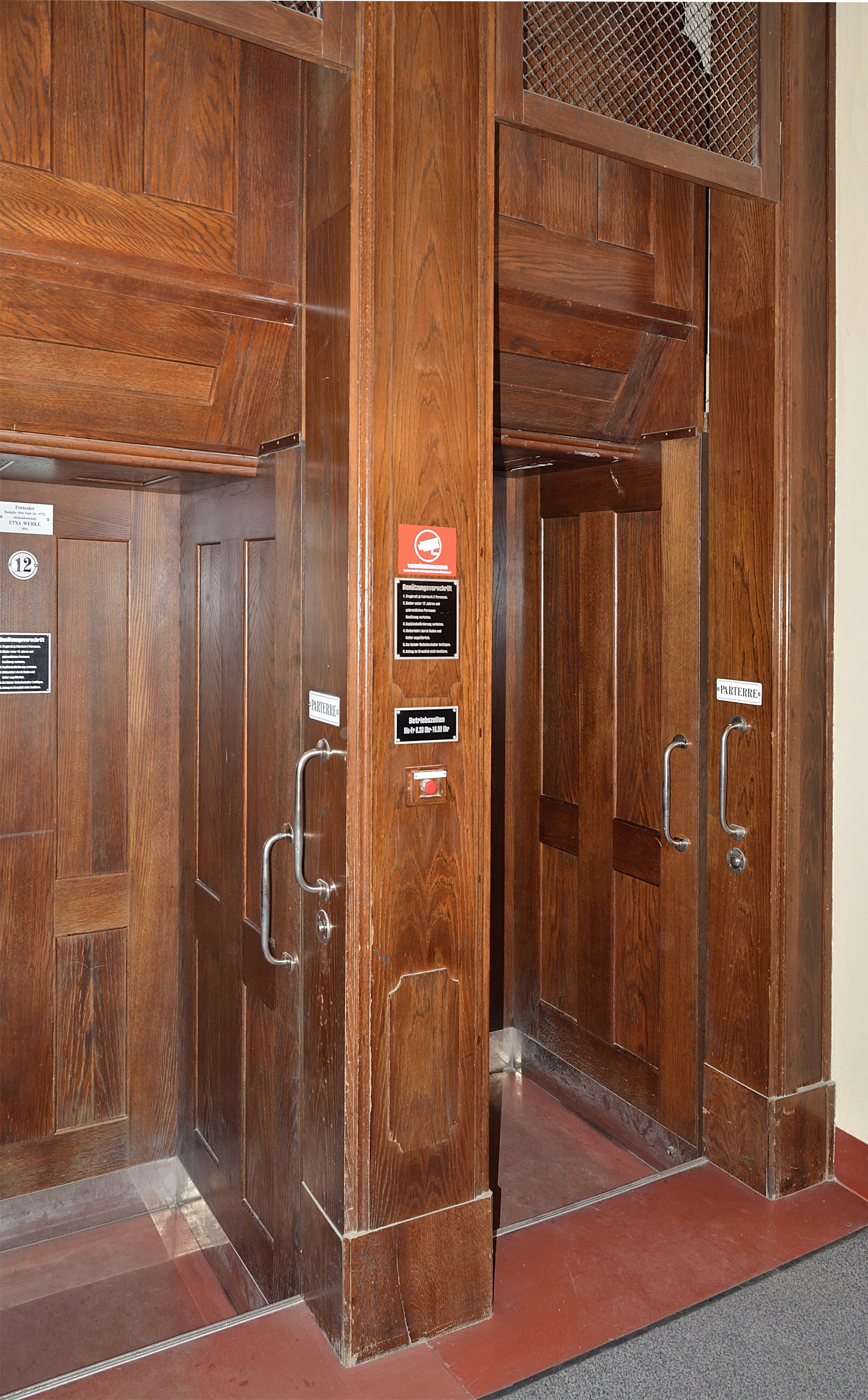
Paternoster in Vienna City Hall, built c. 1918

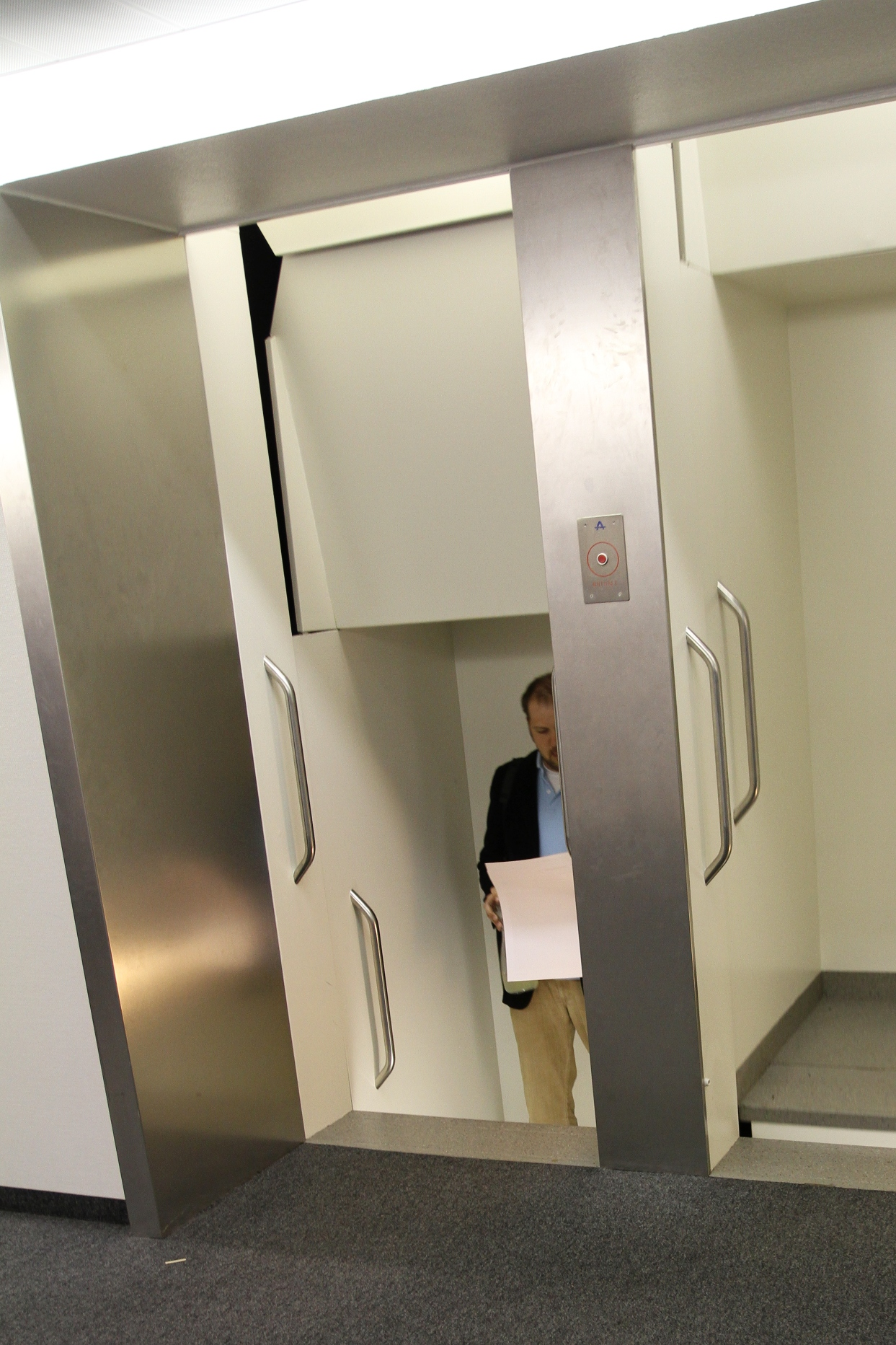
Paternoster at the headquarters of Axel Springer SE

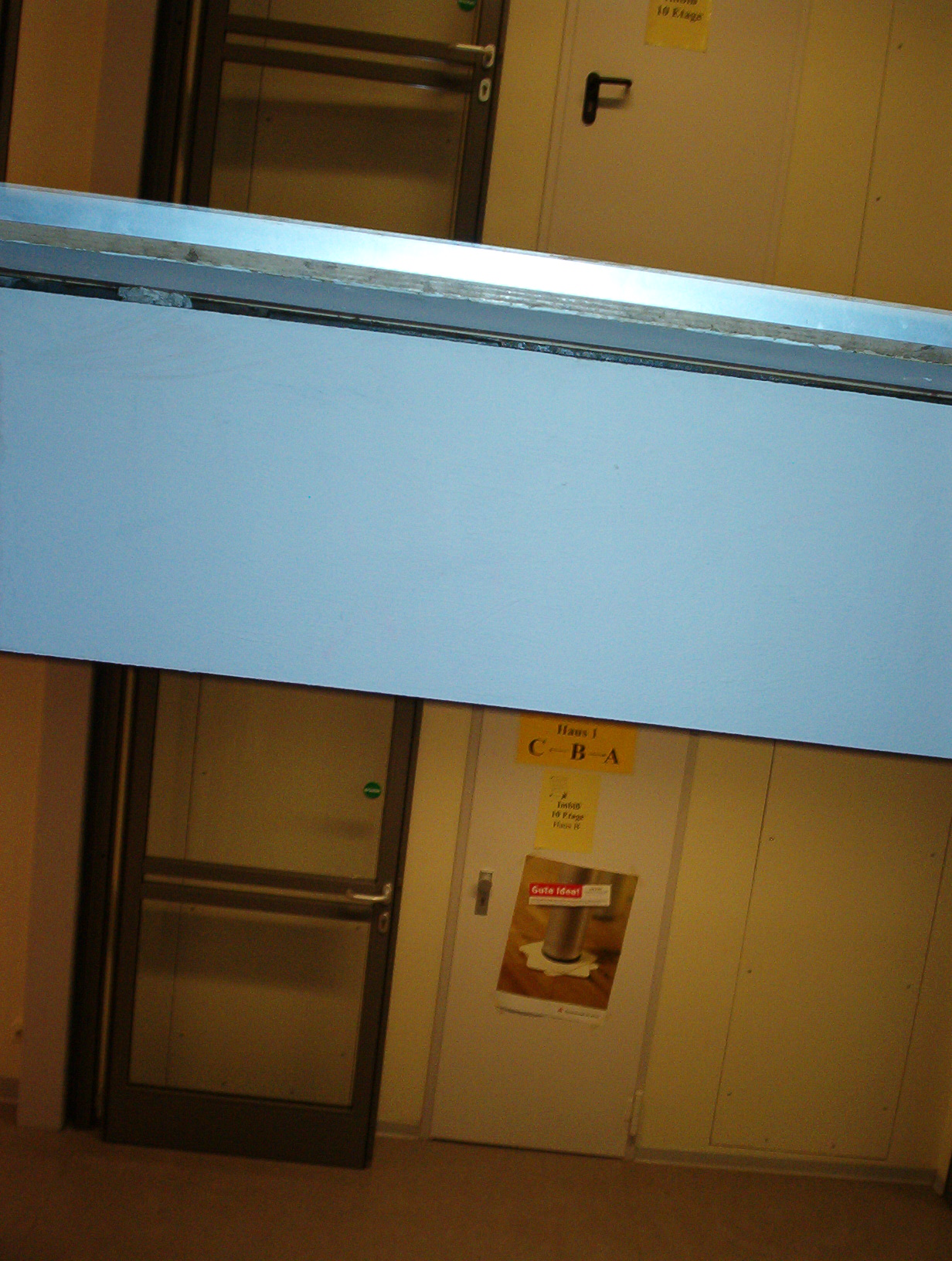
View from inside a paternoster in Berlin, showing floor slab

View from working paternoster in the Albert Sloman Library, University of Essex, prior to 2014

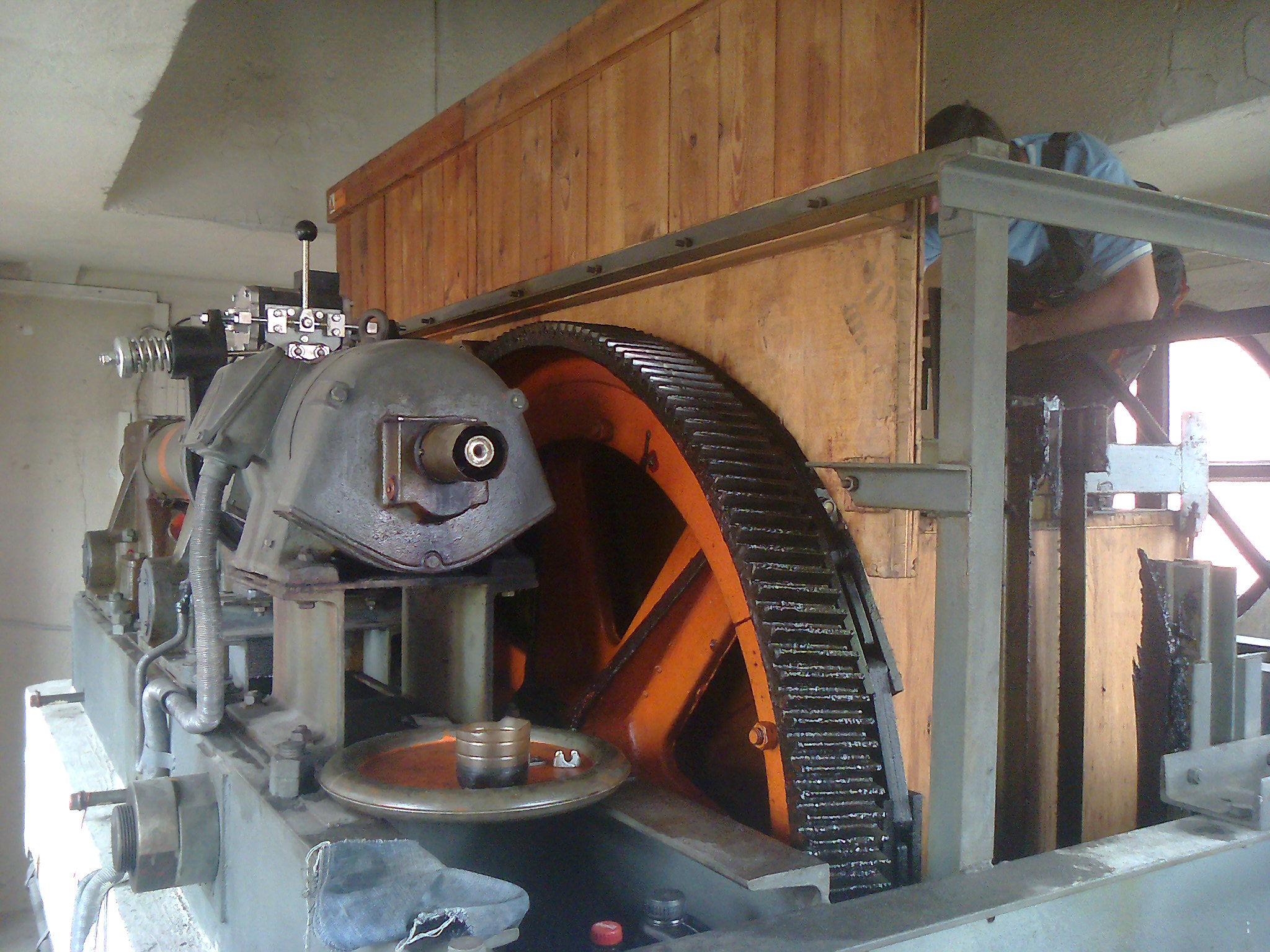
Paternoster machinery in the offices of the Czech Republic's Ministry of Transport, Prague

People using a Paternoster in Finland

== See also ==
- Belt manlift
- Escalator
- List of elevator manufacturers
- Shabbat elevator
- Revolving door
