= Leibniz Society of North America =

Philosophical society

The Leibniz Society of North America is a philosophical society whose purpose is to promote the study of the philosophy of Gottfried Wilhelm Leibniz. The society publishes The Leibniz Review, organizes an annual conference, sponsors group sessions at meetings of the American Philosophical Association, holds an annual essay contest, and issues an annual newsletter.
