= Glenn Hartz =

American philosopher (born 1956)

Glenn A. Hartz
- Born: Glenn Allen Hartz; 1956 (age 69–70)

Education
- Education: The King's College (B.A.); Trinity Evangelical Divinity School (M.A.); Syracuse University (M.S., Ph.D.)
- Thesis: The Problem of Matter's Inherent Nature (1985)
- Doctoral advisor: Jonathan Bennett

Philosophical work
- Era: 21st-century philosophy
- Region: Western philosophy
- Institutions: Ohio State University
- Main interests: early modern philosophy, fiction-response theories, Leibniz's metaphysics
- Notable ideas: theory pluralism

Glenn A. Hartz is an American philosopher and Professor of Philosophy at the Ohio State University. He is known for his works on Leibniz's metaphysics and is the editor of The Leibniz Review.

== Education ==
Glenn Hartz attended The King's College and graduated with a Bachelor of Arts degree in 1978. He went on to study philosophy of religion under William Lane Craig at Trinity Evangelical Divinity School in Deerfield, Illinois and graduated with a Master of Arts in Philosophy of Religion in 1980. He earned a Master of Science in Higher Education from Syracuse University in 1985. He completed his doctoral studies under Jonathan Bennett at Syracuse University in 1985 with research on the nature of matter.

== Books ==
- Hartz, Glenn A. (2007). Leibniz's Final System: Monads, Matter and Animals. London, England: Routledge. doi:10.4324/9780203967966. ISBN 9780203967966.
- Hartz, Glenn (31 May 2024). The Inner Life of Loss. ISBN 979-8-9894814-0-8.

== Articles and Chapters ==
- ——— (1988). "Space and Time in the Leibnizian Metaphysic". Noûs. 22 (4): 493–519. doi:10.2307/2215454.
- ——— (1992). "Leibniz's Phenomenalisms". The Philosophical Review. 101 (3): 511–549. doi:10.2307/2186056.
- Cover, J. A.; ——— (1994). "Are Leibnizian Monads Spatial?". History of Philosophy Quarterly. 11 (3): 295–316. JSTOR 27744630.
- ——— (1998). "Why corporeal substances keep popping up in Leibniz's later philosophy". British Journal for the History of Philosophy. 6 (2): 193–207. doi:10.1080/09608788808570990.
