= Leibniz (disambiguation) =

Gottfried Wilhelm Leibniz (1646–1716) was a German philosopher and mathematician.

Leibniz may also refer to:

- Friedrich Leibniz (1597–1652), father of Gottfried Leibniz
- Leibniz or Leibniz-Keks, a brand of biscuit
- Leibniz Association, a union of German non-university research institutes from various disciplines

== See also ==
- Leibnitz (disambiguation)
- List of things named after Gottfried Leibniz
