= Hermann Bahlsen =

German entrepreneur

- Born: 14 November 1859
- Died: 6 November 1919; Hannover

Hermann Bahlsen (born 14 November 1859 in Hanover, the capital of the then Kingdom of Hanover; died 6 November 1919 in Hanover) was a German entrepreneur in the food industry as well as the inventor of the Leibniz butter biscuit and founder of the Bahlsen confectionery factory.

== Biography ==
=== Birth and education ===
Hermann Bahlsen came from a long-established family of cloth merchants and goldsmiths in Hanover. After completing an apprenticeship in Geneva as a young man, he worked first in his home town and then in London. After returning to Germany, he began to market the “cakes” he had discovered in England.

=== Establishing a company ===
In 1888 he became a partner in a factory for English cakes and biscuits in Hannover. A year later he founded his own company, the "Hannoversche Cakesfabrik H. Bahlsen", on Friesenstrasse. Within a few years, the number of employees rose from 10 to over 100, and by the beginning of World War I to around 1,700. In 1893, Bahlsen had the idea of advertising his butter cakes, which unlike those of his competitors were not sold loose but packed in bags, with a Leibniz quote. This increased sales within a very short time.

=== Recipe for success ===
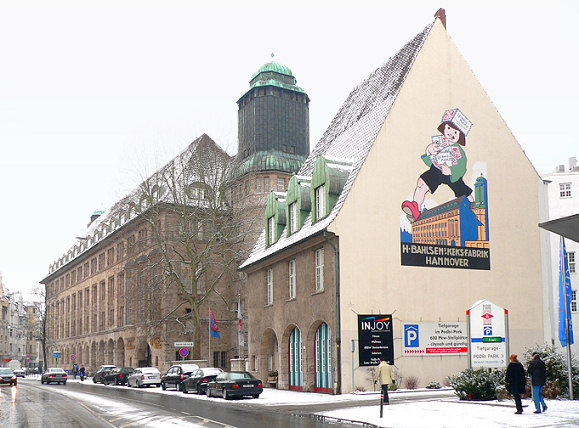
Bahlsen company in Hannover (2006)

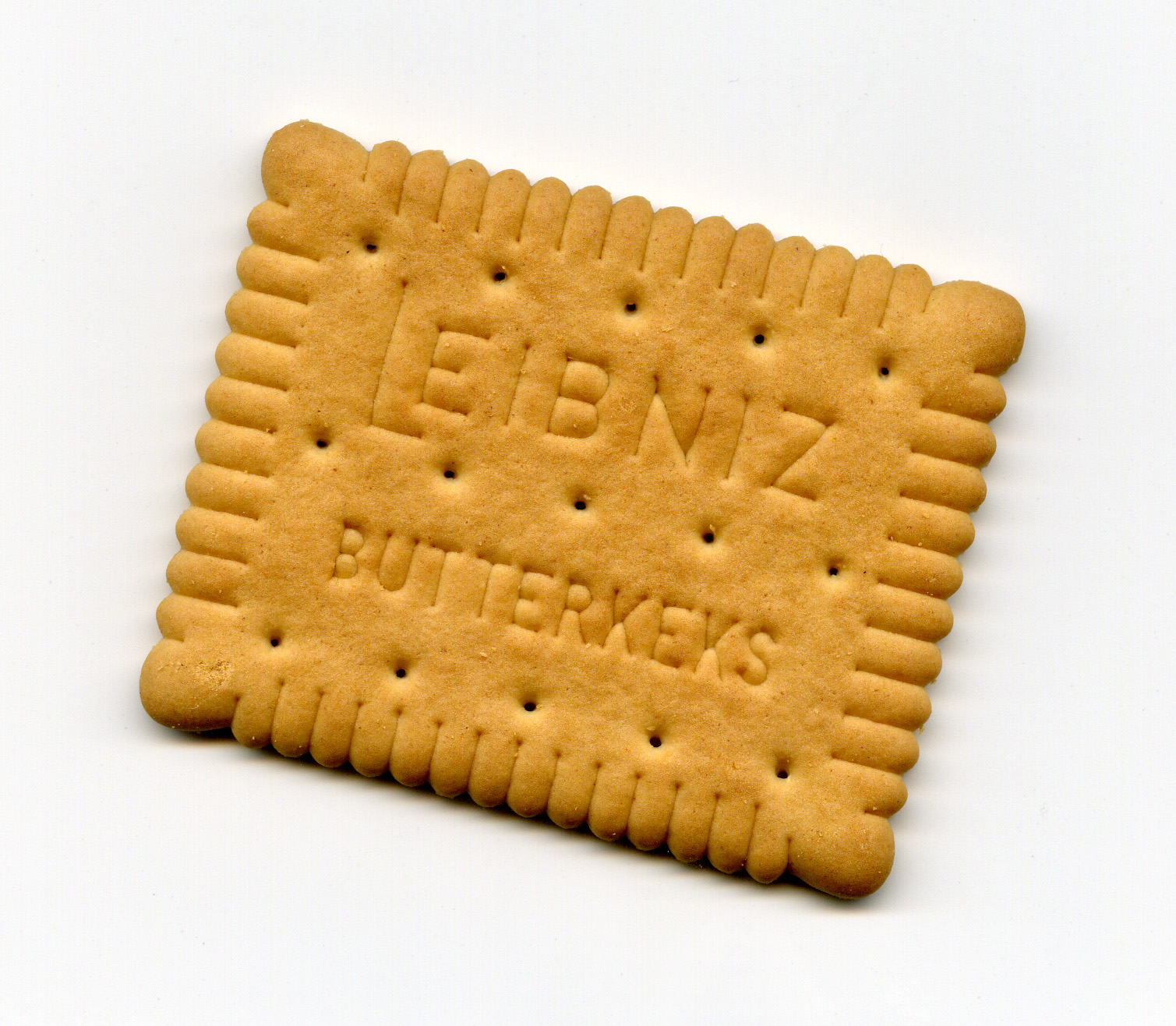
Bahlsen butter cookie with 52 "teeth" and the typical Leibniz lettering

In 1903, a patent was granted for the packaging which guaranteed a long shelf life, which contributed to the success of Bahlsen products. The company logo was designed around the turn of the century based on an Egyptian hieroglyph: The Egyptian word djed (simplified from Bahlsen to TET) means "durability", "eternity" or "everlasting". The well-travelled museum director Friedrich Tewes gave him the idea of the hieroglyph. Previously, Bahlsen had used a different logo for its cookies, showing a jumping horse. At the 1893 World's Fair in Chicago, Tet biscuits won a gold medal. Another characteristic of the biscuits besides the hieroglyph are the 52 "teeth" (heraldic "thorns"), the 15 punched points on the front, and the typical Leibniz lettering. Bahlsen repeatedly commissioned renowned artists with designs, such as Emanuel Josef Margold from the Wiener Werkstätte. Kurt Schwitters and Lotte Pritzel also worked on the image of the Leibniz biscuit.

Bahlsen's production methods were also innovative; he was the first biscuit manufacturer to begin using assembly lines in 1905.

In 1911 or 1912 the Germanisation of the English word “cakes” to “biscuit”, which Bahlsen had fought for a long time, found its way into the Duden dictionary.

Similar to how Heinz Appel replaced the term “delicacies” with his word creation “delicatessen” in the first half of the 20th century, it was the close connection between the creative spirit and art that made the products of the Hanoverian family companies “something special”. Klaus Wiborg, editor of the Frankfurter Allgemeine Zeitung, wrote: "The style that suggests the creative investment and the intellectual entrepreneurial personality behind everyday goods has proven to be the most effective sales promotion in the long run."

=== Social engagement ===
Bahlsen showed a high level of social commitment towards his employees. In 1912, he set up a company health insurance fund and provided medical staff for his employees. He also funded loyalty bonuses. In 1916 and 1917, Bahlsen sponsored the artist Bernhard Hoetger to develop plans for an Egypt-themed city named the TET-Stadt, but they were never realized. It was intended to be both a place of residence and a place of work for the employees of the Bahlsen works; the intended name TET-Stadt referred to the Bahlsen product trademark.

Around 1918, Bahlsen and the architect Carl Arend planned the large-scale project Weißer Berg family pool in Mardorf; “Perhaps one reason for the lack of implementation is the death of Bahlsen in 1919”. The site was taken over by the Hannoversche Bank (since 1922 Deutsche Bank) in 1921.

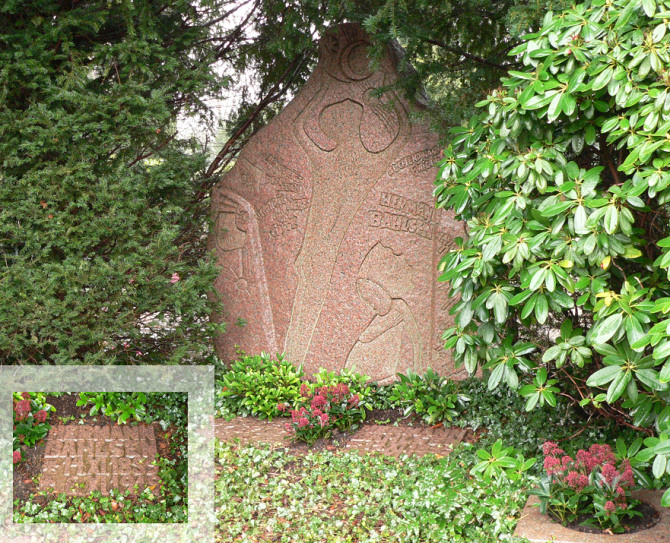
Bahlsen family grave in Hannover, on the left grave plate Hermann Bahlsen as detail enlargement

After the death of the founder Hermann Bahlsen, his sons Werner Bahlsen, Klaus Bahlsen and Hans Bahlsen took over the management of the company. The fourth son Gerhard Bahlsen (1905–1975) became only a co-owner and was mainly active as a publisher and writer. He was buried in a family grave in the New St. Nikolai Cemetery in Hanover's Nordstadt district.
