= The Leibniz Review =

Academic journal devoted to Gottfried Leibniz's thought and work

- Discipline: Philosophy
- Language: English
- Edited by: Glenn Hartz

Publication details
- Former name(s): Leibniz Society Review, Leibniz Society Newsletter & Review
- History: 1991–present
- Publisher: Leibniz Society of North America (United States)
- Frequency: Annual

Standard abbreviations
- ISO 4: Leibniz Rev.

Indexing
- ISSN: 1524-1556 (print); 2153-9162 (web)
- LCCN: sn99008386
- OCLC no.: 40950523

Links
- Journal homepage; Journal page at Philosophy Documentation Center; Online access

The Leibniz Review is a peer-reviewed academic journal devoted to scholarly examination of Gottfried Leibniz's thought and work. It publishes contemporary articles and reviews, as well as original Leibniz texts. The Leibniz Review is sponsored by the Leibniz Society of North America and edited at Ohio State University in Mansfield, Ohio. Subscriptions and access are provided by the Philosophy Documentation Center.

== Abstracting and indexing ==
The journal is abstracted and indexed in the International Bibliography of Periodical Literature, the Leibniz-Bibliographie, The Philosopher's Index, PhilPapers, and Scopus.

== See also ==
- List of philosophy journals
