= Leibniz-Keks =

German brand of biscuit

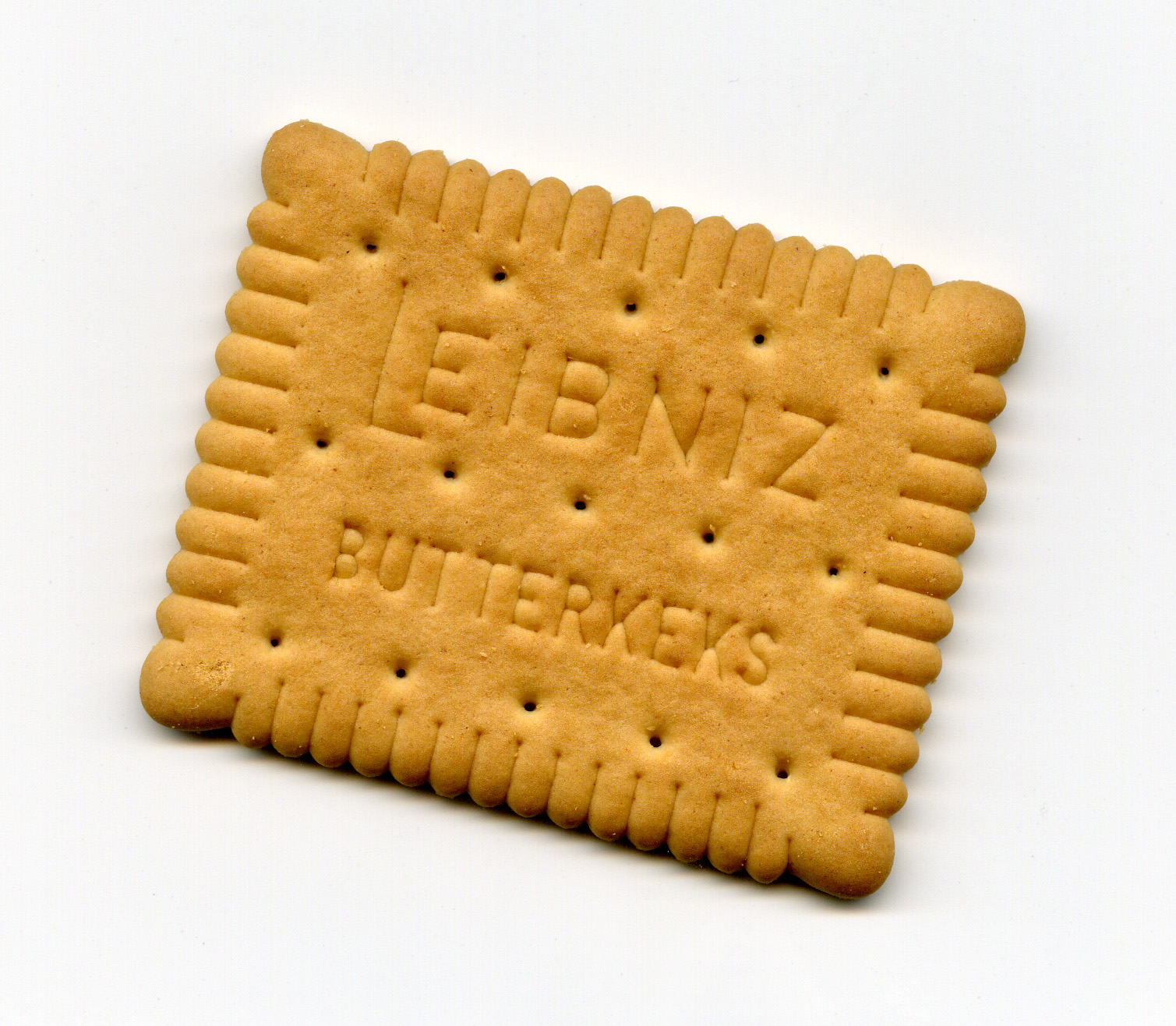
Leibniz-Keks

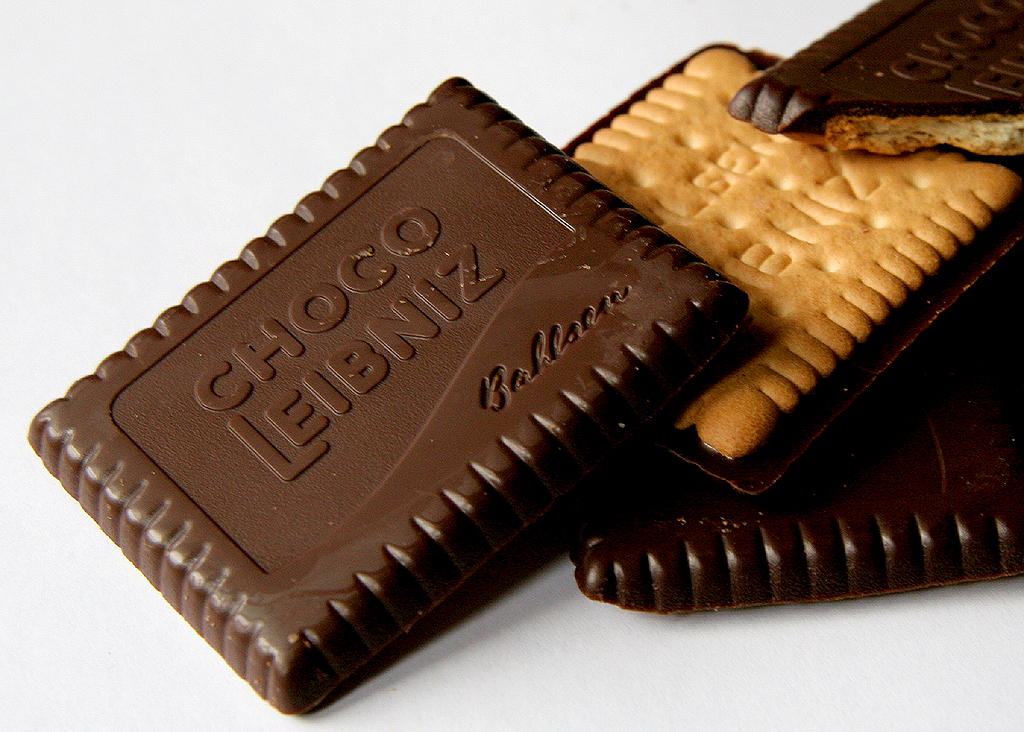
Choco Leibniz

The Leibniz-Keks or Choco Leibniz is a German brand of biscuit or cookie produced by the Bahlsen food company since 1891. It was created by the firm as a rival to a similar French biscuit, the Petit-Beurre.

== Name ==
The brand name Leibniz comes from the philosopher and mathematician Gottfried Wilhelm Leibniz (1646–1716). The only connection between the man and the biscuit is that Leibniz was one of the more famous residents of Hanover, where the Bahlsen company is based. At the time when the biscuit was first made there was a fashion of naming food products after historical celebrities (such as Mozartkugeln).

The Leibniz-Keks is a plain butter biscuit, or Butterkeks as it is known in German, inspired by the French Petit-Beurre created in 1886 by Lefèvre-Utile. The word Keks in Leibniz-Keks was originally a corruption of the English word "cakes" by Bahlsen (who had originally called his product "cakes" but found out that this was mispronounced by the German public). Due to the popularity of the Leibniz-Keks, Keks has since become the generic German word for biscuit or cookies.

== Design ==
The original Leibniz biscuit has a simple and distinctive design. Fifty-two "teeth" frame the rectangular field on which "LEIBNIZ BUTTERKEKS" is imprinted in capital letters. This was Hermann Bahlsen's original 1891 design. There has been debate among biscuit fans whether it is in a square or rectangular shape. The main designer of the biscuits confirmed it is a square design.

The biscuit has been featured in a series of "Monuments of German Design" by the Süddeutsche Zeitung.

== Varieties ==
In addition to the original Butterkeks, there are several varieties of Leibniz on the market today. These include Choco Leibniz (styled as "more chocolate than biscuit"), Leibniz Milch & Honig (milk and honey), Leibniz Vollkorn (wholemeal), and Leibniz Zoo (animal shapes).

== Ingredients ==
Ingredients include sugar, wheat flour, butter, in Choco Leibniz cocoa mass, cocoa butter, whey products, glucose syrup, emulsifier, soya lecithin, whole milk powder, salt, raising agents, sodium bicarbonate, citric acid, and flavouring.
