= Mathematicism =

Use of mathematics as a philosophical framework

Mathematicism is 'the effort to employ the formal structure and rigorous method of mathematics as a model for the conduct of philosophy', or the metaphysical view that reality is fundamentally mathematical. The term has been applied to a number of philosophers, including Pythagoras and René Descartes although the term was not used by themselves.

The role of mathematics in Western philosophy has grown and expanded from Pythagoras onwards. It is clear that numbers held a particular importance for the Pythagorean school, although it is the later work of Plato that attracts the label of mathematicism from modern philosophers. Furthermore it is René Descartes who provides the first mathematical epistemology which he describes as a mathesis universalis, and which is also referred to as mathematicism.

== Pythagoras ==
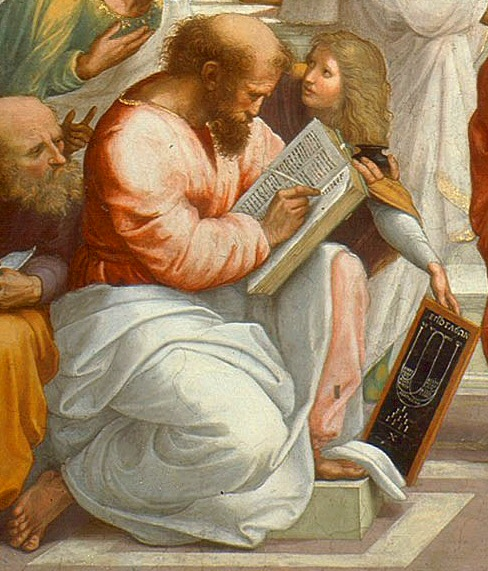
Pythagoras with tablet of ratios

Although we do not have writings of Pythagoras himself, good evidence that he pioneered the concept of mathematicism is given by Plato, and summed up in the quotation often attributed to him that "everything is mathematics". Aristotle says of the Pythagorean school:

The first to devote themselves to mathematics and to make them progress were the so-called Pythagoreans. They, devoted to this study, believed that the principles of mathematics were also the principles of all things that be. Now, since the principles of mathematics are numbers, and they thought they found in numbers, more than in fire and earth and water, similarities with things that are and that become (they judged, for example, that justice was a particular property of numbers, the soul and mind another, opportunity another, and similarly, so to say, anything else), and since furthermore they saw expressed by numbers the properties and the ratios of harmony, since finally everything in nature appeared to them to be similar to numbers, and numbers appeared to be first among all there is in nature, they thought that the elements of numbers were the elements of all that there is, and that the whole world was harmony and number. And all the properties they could find in numbers and in musical chords, corresponding to properties and parts of the sky, and in general to the whole cosmic order, they gathered and adapted to it. And if something was missing, they made an effort to introduce it, so that their tractation be complete. To clarify with an example: since ten seems to be a perfect number and to contain in itself the whole nature of numbers, they said that the bodies that move in the sky are also ten: and since one can only see nine, they added as tenth the anti-Earth.

— Metaphysics A 5. 985 b 23

Further evidence for the views of Pythagoras and his school, although fragmentary and sometimes contradictory, comes from Alexander Polyhistor. Alexander tells us that central doctrines of the Pythagorieans were the harmony of numbers and the ideal that the mathematical world has primacy over, or can account for the existence of, the physical world.

According to Aristotle, the Pythagoreans used mathematics for solely mystical reasons, devoid of practical application. They believed that all things were made of numbers. The number one (the monad) represented the origin of all things and other numbers similarly had symbolic representations. Nevertheless modern scholars debate whether this numerology was taught by Pythagoras himself or whether it was original to the later philosopher of the Pythagorean school, Philolaus of Croton.

Walter Burkert argues in his study Lore and Science in Ancient Pythagoreanism, that the only mathematics the Pythagoreans ever actually engaged in was simple, proofless arithmetic, but that these arithmetic discoveries did contribute significantly to the beginnings of mathematics.

== Plato ==
The Pythagorian school influenced the work of Plato. Mathematical Platonism is the metaphysical view that (a) there are abstract mathematical objects whose existence is independent of us, and (b) there are true mathematical sentences that provide true descriptions of such objects. The independence of the mathematical objects is such that they are non physical and do not exist in space or time. Neither does their existence rely on thought or language. For this reason, mathematical proofs are discovered, not invented. The proof existed before its discovery, and merely became known to the one who discovered it.

In summary, therefore, Mathematical Platonism can be reduced to three propositions:

- Existence: There are mathematical objects.
- Abstractness: Mathematical objects are abstract.
- Independence: Mathematical objects are independent of intelligent agents and their language, thought, and practices.

It is again not clear the extent to which Plato held to these views himself but they were associated with the Platonist school. Nevertheless, this was a significant progression in the ideas of mathematicism.

Markus Gabriel refers to Plato in his Fields of Sense: A New Realist Ontology, and in so doing provides a definition for mathematicism. He says:

Ultimately, set-theoretical ontology is a remainder of Platonic mathematicism. Let mathematicism from here on be the view that everything that exists can be studied mathematically either directly or indirectly. It is an instance of theory-reduction, that is, a claim to the effect that every vocabulary can be translated into that of mathematics such that this reduction grounds all derivative vocabulary and helps us understand it significantly better.

He goes on, however, to show that the term need not be applied merely to the set-theoretical ontology that he takes issue with, but for other mathematical ontologies.

Set-theoretical ontology is just one instance of mathematicism. Depending on one's preferred candidate for the most fundamental theory of quantifiable structure, one can wind up with a graphtheoretical mathematicism, a set-theoretical, category-theoretical, or some other (maybe hybrid) form of mathematicism. However, mathematicism is metaphysics, and metaphysics need not be associated with ontology.

== René Descartes ==
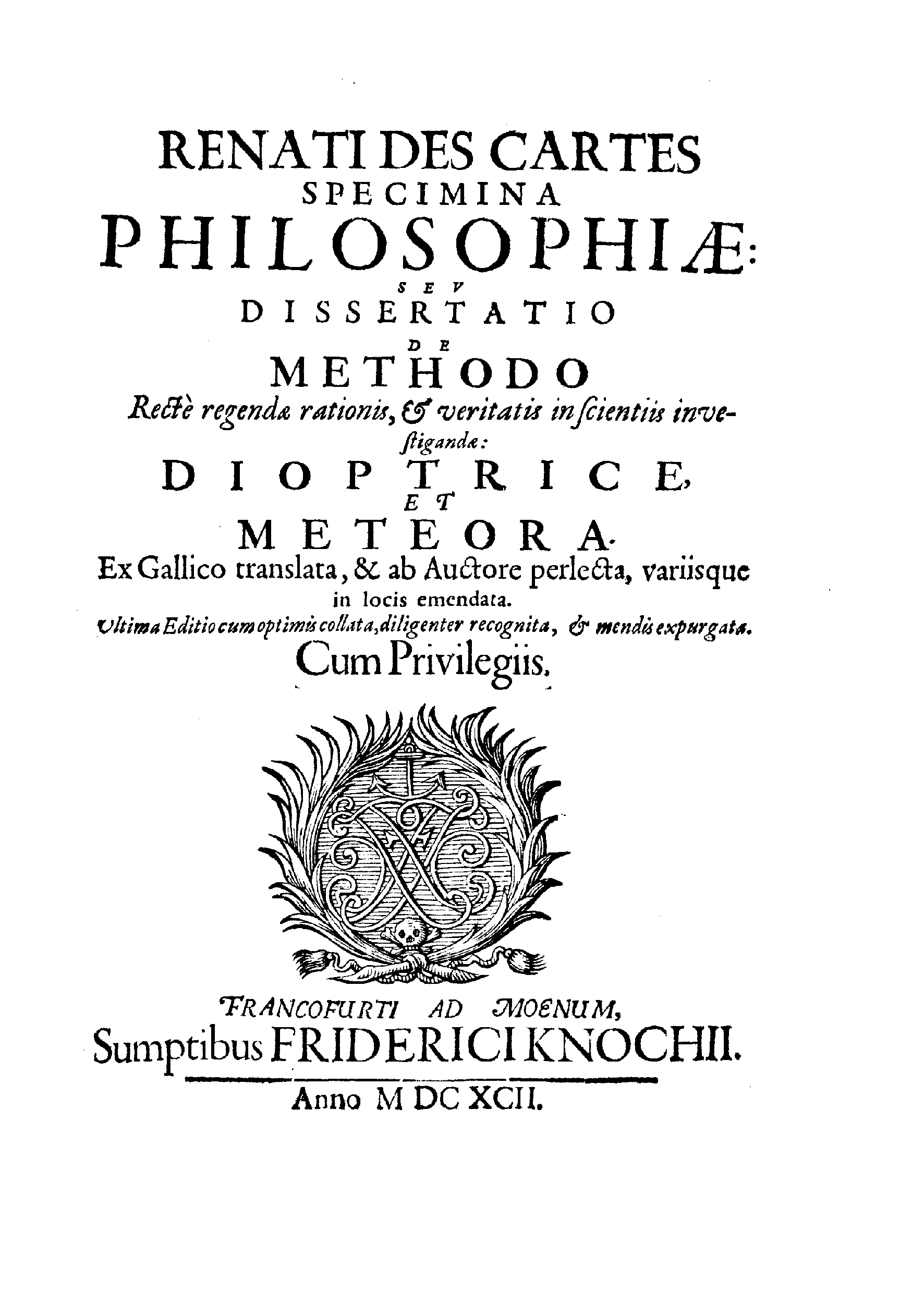
Descartes, René – Discours de la méthode, 1692 – BEIC 1273122

Although mathematical methods of investigation have been used to establish meaning and analyse the world since Pythagoras, it was Descartes who pioneered the subject as epistemology, setting out Rules for the Direction of the Mind. He proposed that method, rather than intuition, should direct the mind, saying:

So blind is the curiosity with which mortals are possessed that they often direct their minds down untrodden paths, in the groundless hope that they will chance upon what they are seeking, rather like someone who is consumed with such a senseless desire to discover treasure that he continually roams the streets to see if he can find any that a passerby might have dropped [...] By 'a method' I mean reliable rules which are easy to apply, and such that if one follows them exactly, one will never take what is false to be true or fruitlessly expend one's mental efforts, but will gradually and constantly increase one's knowledge till one arrives at a true understanding of everything within one's capacity

— René Descartes, Rules for the Direction of the Mind; translated by John Cottingham

In the discussion of Rule Four, Descartes' describes what he calls mathesis universalis:

Rule Four
We need a method if we are to investigate the truth of things.

[...] I began my investigation by inquiring what exactly is generally meant by the term 'mathematics' and why it is that, in addition to arithmetic and geometry, sciences such as astronomy, music, optics, mechanics, among others, are called branches of mathematics. [...] This made me realize that there must be a general science which explains all the points that can be raised concerning order and measure irrespective of the subject-matter, and that this science should be termed mathesis universalis — a venerable term with a well-established meaning — for it covers everything that entitles these other sciences to be called branches of mathematics. [...]

— René Descartes, Rules for the Direction of the Mind; translated by John Cottingham

The concept of mathesis universalis was, for Descartes, a universal science modeled on mathematics. It is this mathesis universalis that is referred to when writers speak of Descartes' mathematicism. Following Descartes, Leibniz attempted to derive connections between mathematical logic, algebra, infinitesimal calculus, combinatorics, and universal characteristics in an incomplete treatise titled "Mathesis Universalis", published in 1695. Following on from Leibniz, Benedict de Spinoza and then various 20th century philosophers, including Bertrand Russell, Ludwig Wittgenstein, and Rudolf Carnap have attempted to elaborate and develop Leibniz's work on mathematical logic, syntactic systems and their calculi and to resolve problems in the field of metaphysics.

== Gottfried Leibniz ==
Leibniz attempted to work out the possible connections between mathematical logic, algebra, infinitesimal calculus, combinatorics, and universal characteristics in an incomplete treatise titled "Mathesis Universalis" in 1695.

In his account of mathesis universalis, Leibniz proposed a dual method of universal synthesis and analysis for the ascertaining truth, described in De Synthesi et Analysi universale seu Arte inveniendi et judicandi (1890).

== Ludwig Wittgenstein ==
One of the perhaps most prominent critics of the idea of mathesis universalis was Ludwig Wittgenstein and his philosophy of mathematics. As anthropologist Emily Martin notes:

Tackling mathematics, the realm of symbolic life perhaps most difficult to regard as contingent on social norms, Wittgenstein commented that people found the idea that numbers rested on conventional social understandings "unbearable".

== Bertrand Russell and Alfred North Whitehead ==
The Principia Mathematica is a three-volume work on the foundations of mathematics written by the mathematicians Alfred North Whitehead and Bertrand Russell and published in 1910, 1912, and 1913. According to its introduction, this work had three aims:

1. To analyze to the greatest possible extent the ideas and methods of mathematical logic and to minimize the number of primitive notions, axioms, and inference rules;
2. To precisely express mathematical propositions in symbolic logic using the most convenient notation that precise expression allows;
3. To solve the paradoxes that plagued logic and set theory at the turn of the 20th century, like Russell's paradox.

There is no doubt that Principia Mathematica is of great importance in the history of mathematics and philosophy: as Irvine has noted, it sparked interest in symbolic logic and advanced the subject by popularizing it; it showcased the powers and capacities of symbolic logic; and it showed how advances in philosophy of mathematics and symbolic logic could go hand-in-hand with tremendous fruitfulness. Indeed, the work was in part brought about by an interest in logicism, the view on which all mathematical truths are logical truths. It was in part thanks to the advances made in Principia Mathematica that, despite its defects, numerous advances in meta-logic were made, including Gödel's incompleteness theorems.

== Michel Foucault ==
In The Order of Things, Michel Foucault discuses mathesis as the conjunction point in the ordering of simple natures and algebra, paralleling his concept of taxinomia. Though omitting explicit references to universality, Foucault uses the term to organise and interpret all of human science, as is evident in the full title of his book: "The Order of Things: An Archaeology of the Human Sciences".

== Tim Maudlin ==
Tim Maudlin argues for "a rigorous mathematical structure using primitive terms that give a natural fit with physics" and investigates why mathematics should provide such a powerful language for describing the physical world. According to Maudlin, "The most obvious explanation for the power of mathematics as the language of physics is that the physical world has the right sort of structure to be represented mathematically."

== Max Tegmark ==
Max Tegmark's mathematical universe hypothesis argues that the universe is a mathematical object in and of itself. Tegmark extends this idea to hypothesize that all mathematical objects exist, which he describes as a form of Platonism or modal realism.

== See also ==
- Digital physics
- Mathematical psychology
- Modern Platonism
- Unit-point atomism
- Wolfram Physics Project
- Mathematical universe hypothesis
- Characteristica universalis
- De Arte Combinatoria
- An Essay towards a Real Character, and a Philosophical Language
- Lingua generalis

== Bibliography ==
- "Mathematicism". Mathematicism | Philosophy, Logic & Mathematics | Britannica. Encyclopaedia Britannica. 1998.
- Burkert, Walter (1 June 1972), Lore and Science in Ancient Pythagoreanism, Cambridge, Massachusetts: Harvard University Press, ISBN 978-0-674-53918-1
- Capparelli, Vincenzo (1941). La sapienza di Pitagora. Edizioni Mediterranee. pp. 1–47.
- Foucault, Michel (2010). The Order of Things: an archaeology of the human sciences. London: Routledge.
- Gabriel, Markus (2015). Fields of sense : a new realist ontology. Edinburgh: Edinburgh University Press. ISBN 978-0748692897.
- Gilson, Étienne (1937). The unity of philosophical experience (PDF). New York : C. Scribner's Sons. pp. 125–220.
- Irvine, Andrew D. (2003). "Principia Mathematica (Stanford Encyclopedia of Philosophy)". Metaphysics Research Lab, CSLI, Stanford University.
- Joost-Gaugier, Christiane L. (2006), Measuring Heaven: Pythagoras and his Influence on Thought and Art in Antiquity and the Middle Ages, Ithaca, New York: Cornell University Press, ISBN 978-0-8014-7409-5
- Kahn, Charles H. (2001), Pythagoras and the Pythagoreans: A Brief History, Indianapolis, Indiana and Cambridge, England: Hackett Publishing Company, ISBN 978-0-87220-575-8
- Linnebo, Øystein (2018). Platonism in the Philosophy of Mathematics. The Stanford Encyclopedia of Philosophy.
- Marciszewski, Witold (1984). "The principle of comprehension as a present-day contribution to mathesis universalis". Philosophia Naturalis (21): 525–526.
- Martin, Emily (2013). "The Potentiality of Ethnography and the Limits of Affect Theory". Current Anthropology. 54 (S7): 156. doi:10.1086/670388. S2CID 143944116.
- Maudlin, Tim (2014). New foundations for physical geometry : the theory of linear structures. Oxford: Oxford University Press. ISBN 978-0198701309.
- OED, Eds. (2001). Oxford English Dictionary (3 ed.). Ocford University Press.
- Rhees, Rush (1970). Discussions of Wittgenstein. New York: Schocken.
- Riedweg, Christoph (2005) [2002], Pythagoras: His Life, Teachings, and Influence, Ithaca, New York: Cornell University Press, ISBN 978-0-8014-7452-1* Romanov, Oleg (2019). "Alexander Polyhistor (1st cn. B.C.E.)". The Internet Encyclopedia of Philosophy.
- Sasaki, Chikara (2003). "'Mathesis Universalis' in the Seventeenth Century". Descartes's Mathematical Thought. Boston Studies in the Philosophy of Science. Vol. 237. pp. 359–418. doi:10.1007/978-94-017-1225-5_10. ISBN 978-90-481-6487-5.
- Descartes, René (20 May 1985). "Rules for the Direction of the Mind". The Philosophical Writings of Descartes. Translated by Cottingham, John. Cambridge University Press. pp. 7–78. doi:10.1017/CBO9780511805042.004. ISBN 978-0-521-24594-4.
- Whitehead, Whitehead, Alfred North and Bertrand Russell (1963). Principia Mathematica. Cambridge: Cambridge University Press. pp. 1.
