= Outline of Gottfried Wilhelm Leibniz =

German polymath (1646–1716)

The following outline is provided as an overview of and topical guide to Gottfried Wilhelm Leibniz.

Gottfried Wilhelm (von) Leibniz (1 July 1646 [O.S. 21 June] – 14 November 1716); German polymath, philosopher logician, mathematician. Developed differential and integral calculus at about the same time and independently of Isaac Newton. Leibniz earned his keep as a lawyer, diplomat, librarian, and genealogist for the House of Hanover, and contributed to diverse areas. His impact continues to reverberate, especially his original contributions in logic and binary representations.

== Achievements and contributions ==
=== Devices ===
- Leibniz calculator

=== Logic ===
- Alphabet of human thought
- Calculus ratiocinator

=== Mathematics ===
- Binary number
- Calculus
- General Leibniz rule
- Leibniz formula for π
- Leibniz integral rule

=== Philosophy ===
- Best of all possible worlds
- Characteristica universalis
- Identity of indiscernibles
- Pre-established harmony
- Principle of sufficient reason

== Personal life ==
- Leibniz's political views
- Leibniz's religious views

== Major works by Leibniz ==
- De Arte Combinatoria
- Discourse on Metaphysics, (text at wikisource)
- Monadology, (text at wikisource)
- New Essays on Human Understanding
- Nova Methodus pro Maximis et Minimis
- Protogaea
- Théodicée

== Manuscript archives and translations of Leibniz's works ==
- Leibniz Archive (Hannover) at the Leibniz Research Center - Hannover
- Leibniz Archive (Potsdam) at the Brandenburg Academy of Humanities and Sciences
- Leibniz Archive (Munster), Leibniz-Forschungsstelle Münster digital edition
- Leibniz Archive (Berlin), digital edition
- Donald Rutherford's translations at UCSD
- Lloyd Strickland's translations at leibniz-translations.com

== Journals focused on Leibniz studies ==
- The Leibniz Review
- Studia Leibnitiana

== Organizations named after Leibniz ==
- Leibniz Association
- Leibniz College, affiliated with the University of Tübingen
- Leibniz Institute of European History
- Leibniz Institute for Polymer Research
- Leibniz Society of North America
- Leibniz Supercomputing Center
- Leibniz University Hannover
- ZBW – Leibniz Information Centre for Economics
- Leibniz Schools in Germany

== Prizes named after Leibniz ==
- Gottfried Wilhelm Leibniz Prize. It is regarded as the highest German award.
- Leibniz Ring awarded by the Hannover Press Club.
- Berlin Leibniz Medal originally awarded by the Royal Prussian Academy of Sciences; currently awarded by the Berlin-Brandenburg Academy of Sciences and Humanities.
- Leibniz Medal (Mainz) awarded by the Mainz Academy of Sciences and Literature.

== Publications about Leibniz ==
Maria Rosa Antognazza's 2009 Leibniz biography is a major recent resource.

== See also ==
- Gottfried Wilhelm Leibniz bibliography
- German Wikipedia Leibniz page; it contains additional information.
