= Mathesis universalis =

Philosophy that mathematics can be used to define all aspects of the universe

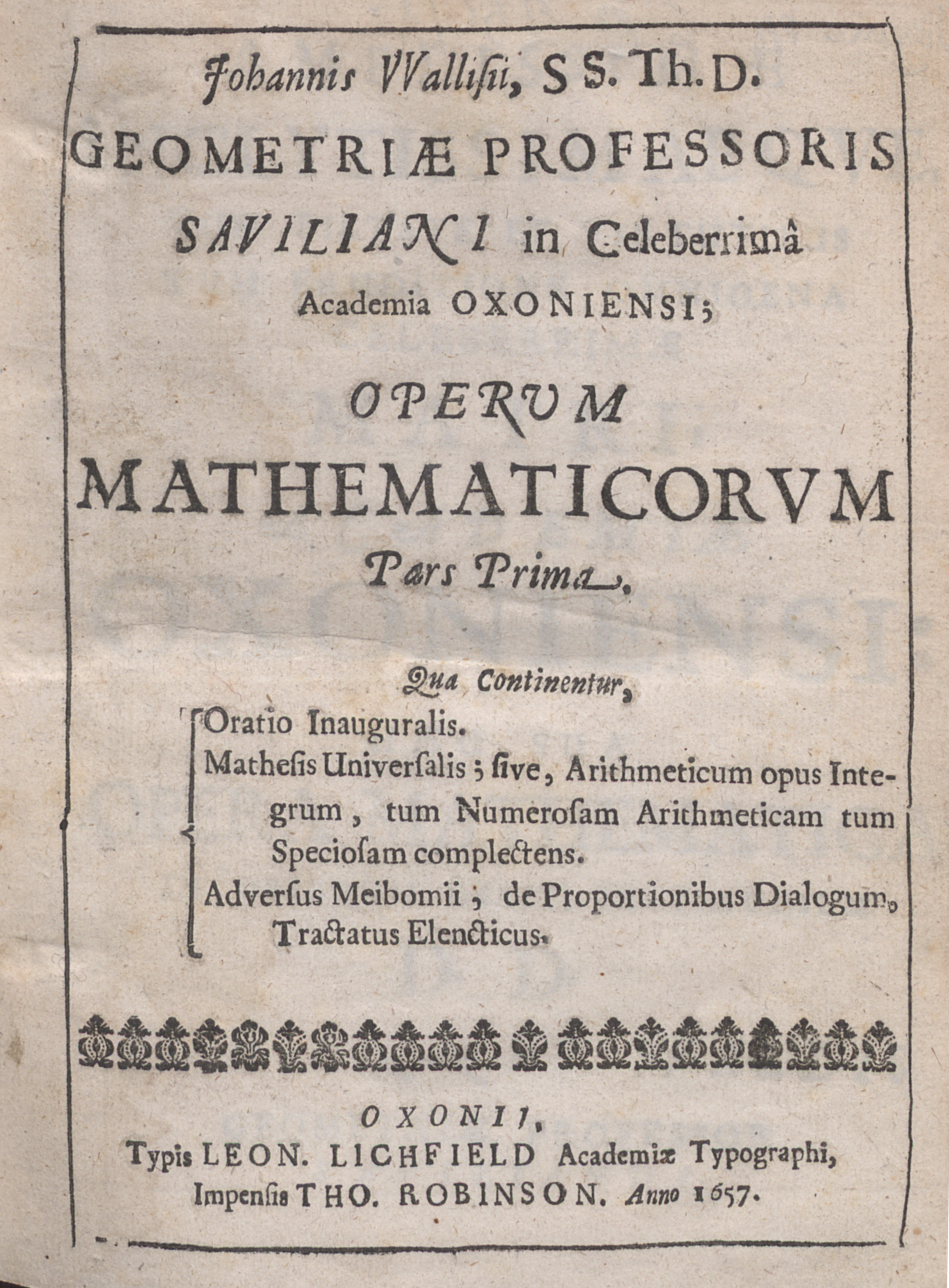
Frontispiece of Operum Mathematicorum Pars Prima (1657) by John Wallis, the first volume of Opera Mathematica including a chapter entitled Mathesis Universalis.

Mathesis universalis (from Greek: μάθησις, mathesis 'science or learning', and Latin: universalis 'universal') is a hypothetical universal science modelled on mathematics envisaged by Descartes and Leibniz, among a number of other 16th- and 17th-century philosophers and mathematicians. For Leibniz, it would be supported by a calculus ratiocinator. John Wallis invokes the name as title in his Opera Mathematica, a textbook on arithmetic, algebra, and Cartesian geometry.

== History ==
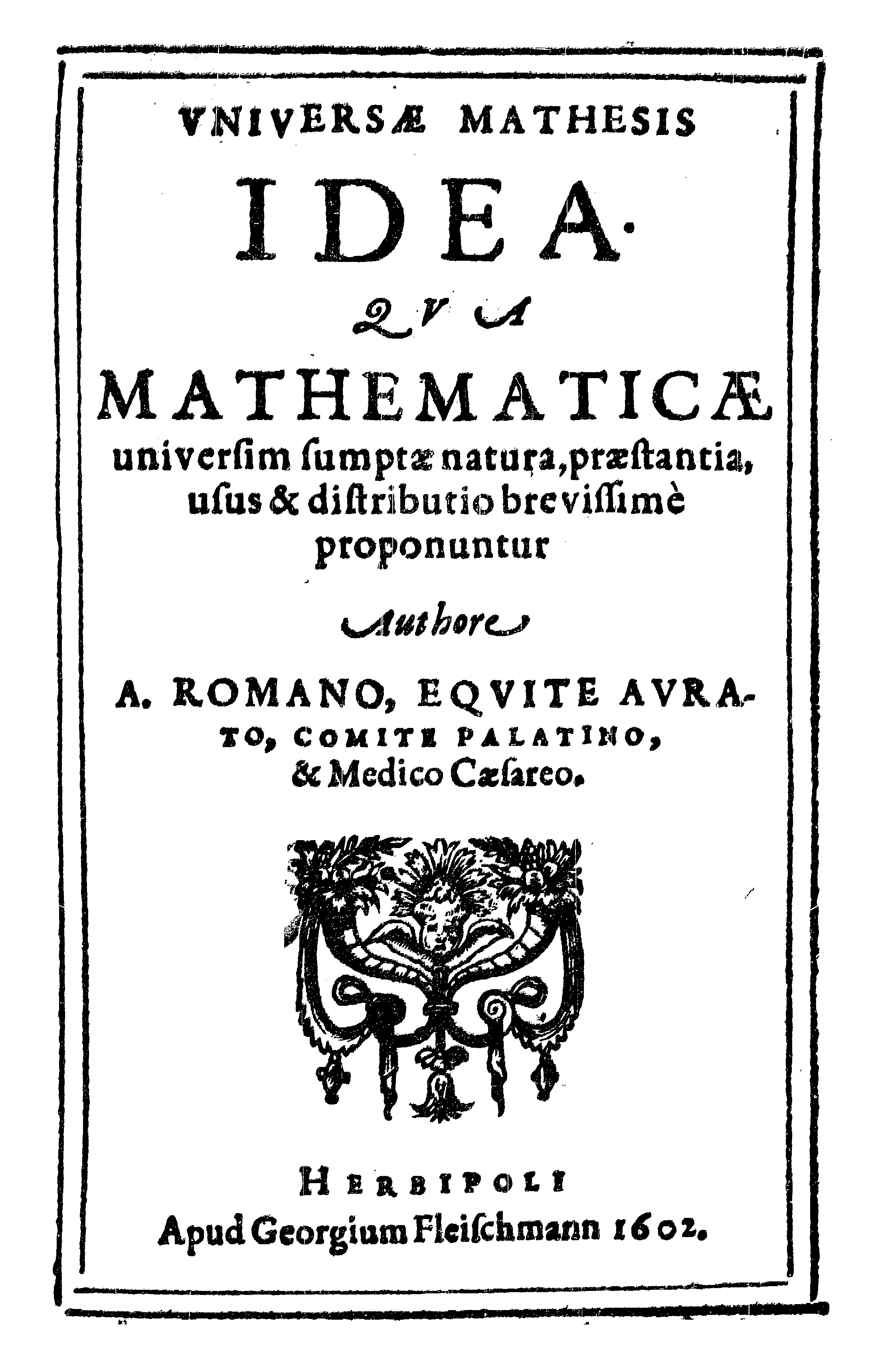
Frontispiece of Universae mathesis idea (1602) by Adriaan van Roomen

Descartes' most explicit description of mathesis universalis occurs in Rule Four of the Rules for the Direction of the Mind, written before 1628. Leibniz attempted to work out the possible connections between mathematical logic, algebra, infinitesimal calculus, combinatorics, and universal characteristics in an incomplete treatise titled "Mathesis Universalis" in 1695.

Predicate logic could be seen as a modern system with some of these universal qualities, at least as far as mathematics and computer science are concerned. More generally, mathesis universalis, along with perhaps François Viète's algebra, represents one of the earliest attempts to construct a formal system.

One of the perhaps most prominent critics of the idea of mathesis universalis was Ludwig Wittgenstein and his philosophy of mathematics. As Anthropologist Emily Martin notes:

Tackling mathematics, the realm of symbolic life perhaps most difficult to regard as contingent on social norms, Wittgenstein commented that people found the idea that numbers rested on conventional social understandings "unbearable".

== René Descartes ==
In Descartes' corpus the term mathesis universalis appears only in the Rules for the Direction of the Mind. In the discussion of Rule Four, Descartes' provides his clearest description of mathesis universalis:

Rule Four
We need a method if we are to investigate the truth of things.

[...] I began my investigation by inquiring what exactly is generally meant by the term 'mathematics' and why it is that, in addition to arithmetic and geometry, sciences such as astronomy, music, optics, mechanics, among others, are called branches of mathematics. [...] This made me realize that there must be a general science which explains all the points that can be raised concerning order and measure irrespective of the subject-matter, and that this science should be termed mathesis universalis — a venerable term with a well-established meaning — for it covers everything that entitles these other sciences to be called branches of mathematics. [...]

— René Descartes, Rules for the Direction of the Mind; translated by John Cottingham

== Gottfried Leibniz ==
In his account of mathesis universalis, Leibniz proposed a dual method of universal synthesis and analysis for the ascertaining truth, described in De Synthesi et Analysi universale seu Arte inveniendi et judicandi (1890).

=== Ars inveniendi ===
Ars inveniendi (Latin for "art of invention") is the constituent part of mathesis universalis corresponding to the method of synthesis.

=== Ars combinatoria ===
Leibniz also identified synthesis with the ars combinatoria, viewing it in terms of the recombination of symbols or human thoughts.

=== Ars judicandi ===
Ars judicandi (Latin for "art of judgement") is the constituent part of mathesis universalis corresponding to the method of analysis.

== See also ==
- Characteristica universalis
- De Arte Combinatoria
- An Essay towards a Real Character, and a Philosophical Language
- Lingua generalis
- Spinoza's Ethics

== Bibliography ==
- Foucault, Michel (2010). The Order of Things: an archaeology of the human sciences. London: Routledge.
- Marciszewski, Witold (1984). "The principle of comprehension as a present-day contribution to mathesis universalis". Philosophia Naturalis (21): 525–526.
- Martin, Emily (2013). "The Potentiality of Ethnography and the Limits of Affect Theory". Current Anthropology. 54 (S7): 156. doi:10.1086/670388. S2CID 143944116.
- Rhees, Rush (1970). Discussions of Wittgenstein. New York: Schocken.
- Sasaki, Chikara (2003). "'Mathesis Universalis' in the Seventeenth Century". Descartes's Mathematical Thought. Boston Studies in the Philosophy of Science. Vol. 237. pp. 359–418. doi:10.1007/978-94-017-1225-5_10. ISBN 978-90-481-6487-5.
- Descartes, René (20 May 1985). "Rules for the Direction of the Mind". The Philosophical Writings of Descartes. Translated by Cottingham, John. Cambridge University Press. pp. 7–78. doi:10.1017/CBO9780511805042.004.
