= Gottfried Wilhelm Leibniz bibliography =

Gottfried Wilhelm Leibniz was a major contributor to mathematics, physics, philosophy, theology, logic, and early computer science; independent inventor of calculus in mathematics; inventor of energy and the action principle in physics; jurist, genealogist, diplomat, librarian; worked towards reunification of Catholic and Protestant faiths.

This in-progress article will list all his published and unpublished works primarily based on the Leibniz Library in Hannover, and its online catalog.

== Table of works ==
Year	Title and description	WikiSource versions	English	German	French
1714	Monadology	Monadology	Monadology Latta(tr)	--	Monadologie
1710	Théodicée	--	--	--	--
1704	New Essays on Human Understanding	Nouveaux Essais sur l’entendement humain	external	--	Nouveaux Essais sur l’entendement humain
1697	Unvorgreiffliche Gedancken, betreffend die Ausübung und Verbesserung der Teutschen Sprache	--	--	Link (University of Giessen)	--
1693	Protogaea	--	--	--	--
1666	De Arte Combinatoria	--	--	--	--
1686	Discourse on Metaphysics	Discourse on Metaphysics	external	--	Discourse on Metaphysics
--	--	--	--	--	--
1677	That not all possibles attain existence	--	external	--	--
1684	Nova Methodus pro Maximis et Minimis	--	external	--	--
--	--	--	--	--	--
--	--	--	--	--	--
--	--	--	--	--	--
--	--	--	--	--	--
--	--	--	--	--	--
--	--	--	--	--	--
--	--	--	--	--	--

Notes:

1. Dates in the table refer to the estimated date of completion of manuscripts if first publication occurred after Leibniz's death (1716).

2. Title and description link to English Wikipedia article if available.

== See also ==
- Leibniz outline

=== Transcribed collections ===
- Collected Letters 1691–1693 (Hannover, 5th Band)
- Opera omnia, nunc primum collectas; at Bibliothèque nationale de France
