= Universal science =

Universal science (German: Universalwissenschaft; Latin: scientia generalis, scientia universalis) is a branch of metaphysics, dedicated to the study of the underlying principles of all science. Instead of viewing knowledge as being separated into branches, Universalists view all knowledge as being part of a single category. Universal science is related to, but distinct from, universal language.

== Precursors ==
Logic and rationalism lie at the foundation of the ideas of universal science. In a broad sense, logic is the study of reasoning. Although there were individuals that implicitly utilized logical methods prior to Aristotle, it is generally agreed he was the originator of modern systems of logic. The Organon, Aristotle's books on logic, details this system. In Categories, Aristotle separates everything into 10 "categories": substance, quantity, quality, relation, place, time, position, state, action, and passion. In De Interpretatione, Aristotle studied propositions, detailing what he determined were the most basic propositions and the relationships between them. The Organon had several other books, which further detailed the process of constructing arguments, deducing logical consequences, and even contained the foundations of the modern scientific method.

The most immediate predecessor to universal science is the system of formal logic, which is the study of the abstract notions of propositions and arguments, usually utilizing symbols to represent these structures. Formal logic differs from previous systems of logic by looking exclusively at the structure of an argument, instead of at the specific aspects of each statement. Thus, while the statements "Jeff is shorter than Jeremy and Jeremy is shorter Aidan, so Jeff is shorter than Aidan" and "Every triangle has less sides than every rectangle and every rectangle has less sides than every pentagon, so every triangle has less sides than every pentagon" deal with different specific information, they are both are equivalent in formal logic to the expression

$\forall x \in X, y \in Y, z \in Z, \quad x < y \wedge y < z \implies x < z$.

By abstracting away from the specifics of each statement and argument, formal logic allows the overarching structure of logic to be studied. This viewpoint inspired later logicians to seek out a set of minimal size containing all of the requisite knowledge from which everything else could be derived and is the fundamental idea behind universal science.

== Llull ==
Ramon Llull was a 13th century Catalan philosopher, mystic, and poet. He is best known for creating an "art of finding truth" with the intention of unifying all knowledge. Llull sought to unify philosophy, theology, and mysticism through a single universal model to understand reality.

Llull compiled his thoughts into his work Ars Magna, which had several versions. The most thorough and complete version being the Ars Generalis Ultima, which he wrote several years before his death. The Ars Generalis Ultima consisted of several books, which explained the Ars, his universal system to understand all of reality. The books included the principles, definitions, and questions, along with ways to combine these things, which Llull thought could serve as the basis from which reality could be studied. Since he was primarily focused upon faith and Christianity, the content of these books was also mainly concerned with religious ideas and concepts. In fact, the Ars contained figures and diagrams representing ideas from Christianity, Islam, and Judaism to serve as a tool to aid philosophers from each of the three religions to discuss ideas in a logical manner.

== Leibniz ==
Gottfried Wilhelm Leibniz was a 17th century German philosopher, mathematician, and political adviser, metaphysician, and logician, distinguished for his achievements including the independent creation of the mathematical field of Calculus.

Leibniz entered the University of Leipzig in 1661, which is where he first studied the teachings of many famous scientists and philosophers, such as Rene Descartes, Galileo Galilei, Francis Bacon, and Thomas Hobbes. These individuals, together with Aristotle, influenced Leibniz's future philosophical ideas, with one major idea being the reconciliation of the ideas of modern philosophers with the thoughts of Aristotle, already demonstrating Leibniz's interest in unification.

Unification played a major role in one of Leibniz's early works, Dissertatio de arte Combinatoria. Written in 1666, De arte Combinatoria was a mathematical and philosophical text that served as the basis for Leibniz's future goal for a universal science. The text starts by analysis several mathematical problems in combinatorics, the study of ways in which objects can be arranged. While the mathematics in the text was not revolutionary, the main impact came from the ideas Leibniz derived following the mathematics. Taking major influence from Ramon Llull's ideas in his Ars Magna, Leibniz argued that the solution to these combinatorial problems served as a base for all logic and reasoning, since all of human knowledge could be viewed as different permutations of some base set.

Leibniz's ideas about unifying human knowledge culminated in his Characteristica universalis, which was a proposed language that would allow for logical statements and arguments to become symbolic calculations. Leibniz aimed to construct "the alphabet of human thought," which was the collection of all of the "primitives" from which all human thought could be derived through the processes described in de arte Combinatoria.

== Modern Influences ==
Although it has never been constructed, the ideas behind Leibniz's universal science have permeated the thoughts of many modern mathematics and philosophers. George Boole, a 19th century English mathematician, expanded upon the ideas of Leibniz. He is responsible for the modern symbolic system logic, aptly called Boolean Algebra. Boole's logical system, and thus also Leibniz's logical system, served as the foundation for modern computers and electronic circuitry.

The fundamental ideas of universal science can also be seen in the modern axiomatic system of mathematics, which constructs mathematical theories as consequences of a set of axioms. In this case, axioms are the primitive elements from which all further propositions can be derived. Hilbert's Program was an attempt by German mathematician David Hilbert to axiomatize all of mathematics in the above manner, and additionally to prove that these axiomatic systems are consistent. Kurt Gödel was an Austrian mathematician and logician, who furthered the investigations in logic and the foundations of mathematics began by Hilbert and Russell in the early 20th century. Gödel is most famous for his incompleteness theorems, which encompass two theorems about provability and completeness of logical systems. In his first theorem, Gödel asserts that any formal system that includes arithmetic will have a statement which cannot be proven nor disproven within the system. His second theorem stated that a formal system additionally cannot prove that it is consistent, using methods only from that system. Thus, Gödel essentially refuted Hilbert's Program, along with aspects of universal science.

== See also ==
- Architectonics
- Unified Science
- Universal Language
- Ars Magna
- Dissertatio de arte Combinatoria
- Characteristica universalis
- Mathesis universalis
