= Trialism (disambiguation) =

Trialism may refer to:

- Trialism (philosophy), a designation for several philosophical concepts
- Trialism (politics), a political doctrine focused on relations between three political subjects:
  - Trialism in Austria-Hungary, a political doctrine advocating transformation of the dual Austro-Hungarian Monarchy into a triune state, by creating a third constituent polity
  - Trialism of Dalmatia, Croatia and Slavonia, a political doctrine on relations between historical realms of Dalmatia, Croatia and Slavonia, prominent mostly during the period between 1848 and 1918
  - Trialism in the Kingdom of Serbs, Croats and Slovenes (Yugoslavia), a political doctrine advocating transformation of the kingdom into a complex state, with three constituent polities, for Serbs, Croats and Slovenes

== See also ==
- Triallist (disambiguation)
- Trinity (disambiguation)
