= Triallist =

Triallist or trialist may refer to:

- A person who takes part in trials, in particular,
  - Time trialist
  - A Trialist
- An advocate of trialism (philosophy)
- An advocate of trialism (politics)

== See also ==
- Trialism (disambiguation)
