= Some Remarks on Logical Form =

1929 academic paper by Ludwig Wittgenstein

"Some Remarks on Logical Form" (1929) was the only academic paper ever published by Ludwig Wittgenstein. It contained Wittgenstein's thinking on logic and the philosophy of mathematics immediately before the rupture that divided the early Wittgenstein of the Tractatus Logico-Philosophicus from the later Wittgenstein represented in the Philosophical Investigations. The approach to logical form in the paper reflected Frank P. Ramsey's critique of Wittgenstein's account of color in the Tractatus, and has been analyzed by G. E. M. Anscombe and Jaakko Hintikka, among others. In a letter to the editor of Mind in 1933 Wittgenstein referred to it as "a short (and weak) article".
