= John F. Sowa =

Artificial intelligence researcher (born 1940)

- Born: 1940 (age 85–86)
- Education: Massachusetts Institute of Technology BS 1962; Harvard University MA 1966; Vrije Universiteit Brussel PhD 1999
- Occupation: Computer scientist
- Known for: Conceptual graphs
- Spouse: Cora Angier Sowa
- Website: JFSowa.com

John Florian Sowa (born 1940) is an American computer scientist, an expert in artificial intelligence and computer design, and the inventor of conceptual graphs.

== Biography ==
Sowa received a BS in mathematics from Massachusetts Institute of Technology in 1962, an MA in applied mathematics from Harvard University in 1966, and a PhD in computer science from the Vrije Universiteit Brussel in 1999 with a dissertation titled "Knowledge Representation: Logical, Philosophical, and Computational Foundations".

Sowa spent most of his professional career at IBM, starting in 1962 at IBM's applied mathematics group. Over the decades he has researched and developed emerging fields of computer science from compilers, programming languages, and system architecture to artificial intelligence and knowledge representation. In the 1990s Sowa was associated with the IBM Educational Center in New York. Over the years he taught courses at the IBM Systems Research Institute, Binghamton University, Stanford University, the Linguistic Society of America and the Université du Québec à Montréal. He is a fellow of the Association for the Advancement of Artificial Intelligence.

After early retirement at IBM, Sowa in 2001 cofounded VivoMind Intelligence, Inc. with Arun K. Majumdar. With this company he was developing data-mining and database technology, more specifically high-level "ontologies" for artificial intelligence and automated natural language understanding. Currently Sowa is working with Kyndi Inc., also founded by Majumdar.

John Sowa is married to the philologist Cora Angier Sowa, and they live in Croton-on-Hudson, New York.

== Work ==
Sowa's research interests since the 1970s were in the field of artificial intelligence, expert systems and database query linked to natural languages. In his work he combines ideas from numerous disciplines and eras modern and ancient, for example, applying ideas from Aristotle, the medieval scholastics to Alfred North Whitehead and including database schema theory, and incorporating the model of analogy of Islamic scholar Ibn Taymiyyah in his works.

=== Conceptual graph ===
Sowa invented conceptual graphs, a graphic notation for logic and natural language, based on the structures in semantic networks and on the existential graphs of Charles S. Peirce. He introduced the concept in the 1976 article "Conceptual graphs for a data base interface" in the IBM Journal of Research and Development. He elaborated upon it in the 1983 book Conceptual structures: information processing in mind and machine.

In the 1980s, this theory had "been adopted by a number of research and development groups throughout the world. International conferences on conceptual structures (ICCS) have been held since 1993, following a series of conceptual graph workshops that began in 1986.

=== Sowa's law of standards ===
In 1991, Sowa first stated his Law of Standards:

"Whenever a major organization develops a new system as an official standard for X, the primary result is the widespread adoption of some simpler system as a de facto standard for X."

Like Gall's law, The Law of Standards is essentially an argument in favour of underspecification. Examples include:

- The introduction of PL/I resulting in COBOL and FORTRAN becoming the de facto standards for business and scientific programming respectively
- The introduction of Algol-68 resulting in Pascal becoming the de facto standard for academic programming
- The introduction of the Ada language resulting in C becoming the de facto standard for US Department of Defense programming
- The introduction of OS/2 resulting in Windows becoming the de facto standard for desktop OS
- The introduction of X.400 resulting in SMTP becoming the de facto standard for electronic mail
- The introduction of X.500 resulting in LDAP becoming the de facto standard for directory services

== Publications ==
- 1984. Conceptual Structures - Information Processing in Mind and Machine. The Systems Programming Series, Addison-Wesley
- 1991. Principles of Semantic Networks. Morgan Kaufmann.
- Mineau, Guy W; Moulin, Bernard; Sowa, John F, eds. (1993). Conceptual Graphs for Knowledge Representation. LNCS. Vol. 699. doi:10.1007/3-540-56979-0. ISBN 978-3-540-56979-4. S2CID 32275791.
- 1994. International Conference on Conceptual Structures (2nd : 1994 : College Park, Md.) Conceptual structures, current practices : Second International Conference on Conceptual Structures, ICCS'94, College Park, Maryland, USA, August 16–20, 1994 : proceedings. William M. Tepfenhart, Judith P. Dick, John F. Sowa, eds.
- Ellis, Gerard; Levinson, Robert; Rich, William; Sowa, John F, eds. (1995). Conceptual Structures: Applications, Implementation and Theory. LNCS. Vol. 954. doi:10.1007/3-540-60161-9. ISBN 978-3-540-60161-6. S2CID 27300281.
- Lukose, Dickson; Delugach, Harry; Keeler, Mary; Searle, Leroy; Sowa, John, eds. (1997). Conceptual Structures: Fulfilling Peirce's Dream. LNCS. Vol. 1257. doi:10.1007/BFb0027865. ISBN 3-540-63308-1. S2CID 1934069.
- 2000. Knowledge representation : logical, philosophical, and computational foundations, Brooks Cole Publishing Co., Pacific Grove

Articles, a selection

- Sowa, J. F. (July 1976). "Conceptual Graphs for a Data Base Interface". IBM Journal of Research and Development. 20 (4): 336–357. doi:10.1147/rd.204.0336.
- Sowa, J. F.; Zachman, J. A. (1992). "Extending and formalizing the framework for information systems architecture". IBM Systems Journal. 31 (3): 590–616. doi:10.1147/sj.313.0590.
- 1992. "Conceptual Graph Summary"; In: T.E. Nagle et al. (Eds.). Conceptual Structures: Current Research and Practice. Chichester: Ellis Horwood.
- 1995. "Top-level ontological categories." in: International journal of human-computer studies. Vol. 43, Iss. 5–6, Nov. 1995, pp. 669–685
- 2006. "Semantic Networks". In: Encyclopedia of Cognitive Science.. John Wiley & Sons.
