= Studia Leibnitiana =

- Discipline: Philosophy, history of science
- Language: English, French, German
- Edited by: Sven Erdner, Jürgen Herbst

Publication details
- History: 1969–present
- Publisher: Franz Steiner Verlag on behalf of the Gottfried-Wilhelm-Leibniz-Gesellschaft (Germany)
- Frequency: Biannually

Standard abbreviations
- ISO 4: Stud. Leibnitiana

Indexing
- CODEN: STLBBI
- ISSN: 0039-3185
- LCCN: 70425291
- OCLC no.: 610262934

Links
- Journal homepage; Journal page at publisher's website; Online access

Studia Leibnitiana is a biannual peer-reviewed academic journal established in 1969. It publishes scholarly articles on philosophy and the history of science of the early modern period, especially related to the German philosopher and polymath Gottfried Wilhelm Leibniz.

The journal is published by Franz Steiner Verlag on behalf of the Gottfried-Wilhelm-Leibniz-Gesellschaft. Studia Leibnitiana publishes articles and book reviews in English, French and German.

== See also ==
- Outline of Gottfried Wilhelm Leibniz
