= Remarks on the Foundations of Mathematics =

1956 work by philosopher Ludwig Wittgenstein

- First English-language edition
- Editor: G. H. von Wright, Rush Rhees
- Author: Ludwig Wittgenstein
- Original title: Bemerkungen über die Grundlagen der Mathematik
- Translator: G.E.M. Anscombe
- Language: German
- Publisher: Blackwell
- Publication date: 1956

Remarks on the Foundations of Mathematics (German: Bemerkungen über die Grundlagen der Mathematik) is a book of Ludwig Wittgenstein's notes on the philosophy of mathematics. It has been translated from German to English by G.E.M. Anscombe, edited by G.H. von Wright and Rush Rhees, and published first in 1956. The text has been produced from passages in various sources by selection and editing. The notes have been written during the years 1937–1944 and a few passages are incorporated in the Philosophical Investigations which were composed later.

When the book appeared it received many negative reviews mostly from working logicians and mathematicians, among them Michael Dummett, Paul Bernays, and Georg Kreisel. Kreisel's scathing review received particular attention although he later distanced himself from it. In later years however it received more positive reviews. Today Remarks on the Foundations of Mathematics is read mostly by philosophers sympathetic to Wittgenstein and they tend to adopt a more positive stance.

Wittgenstein's philosophy of mathematics is exposed chiefly by simple examples on which further skeptical comments are made. The text offers an extended analysis of the concept of mathematical proof and an exploration of Wittgenstein's contention that philosophical considerations introduce false problems in mathematics. Wittgenstein in the Remarks adopts an attitude of doubt in opposition to much orthodoxy in the philosophy of mathematics.

Particularly controversial in the Remarks was Wittgenstein's "notorious paragraph", which contained an unusual commentary on Gödel's incompleteness theorems. Multiple commentators read Wittgenstein as misunderstanding Gödel. Victor Rodych notes in the Stanford Encyclopedia of Philosophy that Wittgenstein appears to have written the appendix containing the paragraph in 1937–38 after reading only the informal introduction to Gödel's 1931 paper, so his example may rest on Gödel's introductory statements rather than on the proof itself. In 2000 Juliet Floyd and Hilary Putnam suggested that the majority of commentary misunderstands Wittgenstein but their interpretation has not been met with approval.

Wittgenstein wrote

I imagine someone asking my advice; he says: "I have constructed a proposition (I will use 'P' to designate it) in Russell's symbolism, and by means of certain definitions and transformations it can be so interpreted that it says: 'P is not provable in Russell's system'. Must I not say that this proposition on the one hand is true, and on the other hand unprovable? For suppose it were false; then it is true that it is provable. And that surely cannot be! And if it is proved, then it is proved that it is not provable. Thus it can only be true, but unprovable." Just as we can ask, " 'Provable' in what system?," so we must also ask, "'True' in what system?" "True in Russell's system" means, as was said, proved in Russell's system, and "false" in Russell's system means the opposite has been proved in Russell's system.—Now, what does your "suppose it is false" mean? In the Russell sense it means, "suppose the opposite is proved in Russell's system"; if that is your assumption you will now presumably give up the interpretation that it is unprovable. And by "this interpretation" I understand the translation into this English sentence.—If you assume that the proposition is provable in Russell's system, that means it is true in the Russell sense, and the interpretation "P is not provable" again has to be given up. If you assume that the proposition is true in the Russell sense, the same thing follows. Further: if the proposition is supposed to be false in some other than the Russell sense, then it does not contradict this for it to be proved in Russell's system. (What is called "losing" in chess may constitute winning in another game.)

The debate has been running around the so-called Key Claim: If one assumes that P is provable in PM, then one should give up the "translation" of P by the English sentence "P is not provable".

Wittgenstein does not mention the name of Kurt Gödel who was a member of the Vienna Circle during the period in which Wittgenstein's early ideal language philosophy and Tractatus Logico-Philosophicus dominated the circle's thinking; multiple writings of Gödel in his Nachlass contain his own antipathy for Wittgenstein, and belief that Wittgenstein wilfully misread the theorems. Some commentators, such as Rebecca Goldstein, have hypothesized that Gödel developed his logical theorems in opposition to Wittgenstein.

== See also ==
- Remarks on the Philosophy of Psychology
- Remarks on Colour
