= Cartesian Reflections =

2008 book by John Cottingham

- Author: John Cottingham
- Cover artist: Jan Baptist Weenix, Portrait of René Descartes – 1647–1649
- Language: English
- Subject: History of Philosophy
- Publisher: Oxford University Press
- Publication date: 2008
- Publication place: United Kingdom
- Media type: Print (Hardcover and Paperback)
- Pages: 332
- ISBN: 978-0-19-922697-9

Cartesian Reflections is a 2008 book by the philosopher John Cottingham. The work consists of several essays that deal with diverse topics, such as René Descartes's views of animals, his position on the dualism of mind and body and the relation between his thoughts and those of Baruch Spinoza.

== Reviews ==
- Review in Notre Dame Philosophical Reviews 8 (L. Alanen)
- Review in Logical Analysis and History of Philosophy 14, pp. 203–209 (J. Doomen)
- Review in the Review of Metaphysics 63, pp. 180–182 (W. Jaworski)
- Review in French Studies 64, pp. 83, 84 (M. Moriarty)
