= Juliet Floyd =

American philosopher

- Born: 1960 (age 65–66)

Education
- Education: Harvard University

Philosophical work
- Era: Contemporary philosophy
- Region: Western philosophy
- School: Analytic philosophy
- Institutions: Boston University; City College of New York
- Main interests: History of analytic philosophy, philosophy of logic, philosophy of mathematics, philosophy of language, Immanuel Kant, Ludwig Wittgenstein

Juliet Floyd (born 1960) is an American philosopher who is professor of philosophy at Boston University. Her strongest research interests lie in early analytic philosophy (on which she has edited a volume) and she has used early analytic philosophy as a lens to examine a diverse array of topics.

== Education and career ==
Floyd received a bachelor's degree in philosophy from Wellesley College in 1982, and went on to study at Harvard University, being awarded a doctorate in philosophy in 1990.

After receiving her doctorate, Floyd accepted an appointment as assistant professor of philosophy at the City College of New York. She spent a term as a visiting assistant professor of philosophy at Boston University in 1995 before accepting a permanent associate professorship of philosophy there in 1996. In 2003 she received cross-appointments in the Institute of Editorial Studies, the Institute for the Philosophy of Religion, and the Department of Philosophy. She was promoted to full professor of philosophy in 2006. Floyd has also spent time as a visiting professor of philosophy at the University of Vienna, Pantheon-Sorbonne University, and the Michel de Montaigne University Bordeaux 3.

Floyd became an associate senior editor of the Stanford Encyclopedia of Philosophy on topics related to 20th-century philosophy in 2012, joined the editorial board (for topics related to early analytic philosophy) of the Archiv für Geschichte der Philosophie in 2011, and became an associate editor of the Journal for the History of Early Analytical Philosophy in 2011. She also served on the editorial board of the Nordic Wittgenstein Review from 2011 to 2013 and on the editorial board (for topics related to early analytic philosophy) of the Journal of the History of Philosophy from 2008 to 2010.

Floyd was a fellow of the Lichtenberg-Kolleg Institute of Advanced Study, Georg August Universität, Göttingen, in 2009–2010, and received a Berlin Prize Fellowship from the American Academy in Berlin in 2008 and a Fulbright Senior Research Award in 2003–04.

== Research areas ==
Floyd's research has generally centered around 20th-century philosophy, especially the early development of analytic philosophy. Significant focuses of her research have included comparative analyses of differing accounts of the nature of objectivity and reason, issues of rule-following and skepticism, as well as the limitations of formal logic, analysis, and mathematics. She has written on the ideas of Ludwig Wittgenstein and Immanuel Kant, and has made forays into philosophy of logic, philosophy of mathematics, and philosophy of language.

Floyd (in conjunction with Hilary Putnam) has suggested a novel reading of Wittgenstein's "notorious paragraph" in Remarks on the Foundations of Mathematics dealing with Kurt Gödel's first incompleteness theorem, positing that Wittgenstein's understanding of the meaning of Gödel's first theorem was far greater than has been commonly believed, although this reading has been criticized. Floyd and Putnam have also more generally defended Wittgenstein's Remarks as demonstrating significantly greater understanding of mathematics than he is generally credited with.

== Publications ==
Floyd has written many peer-reviewed papers, and has served as editor for several series, primarily about analytic philosophy. She has served as the editor of one volume, Future Pasts: The Analytic Tradition in Twentieth Century Philosophy, a collection of essays related to Burton Dreben's belief that analytic philosophy was a failed effort to bring to philosophy the level of clarity offered by science, and his further belief that it was most important because of its failure to do so. In 2013 she was working on a manuscript that explores the significance of the interactions between Wittgenstein, Gödel, and Alan Turing, and was co-editing a volume of essays on Turing's philosophical importance. In 2022, she wrote a book titled Wittgenstein's Philosophy of Mathematics, about Ludwig Wittgenstein.
