= The Rationalists =

1988 book by John Cottingham

- Author: John Cottingham
- Cover artist: Pierre Louis Dumesnil, Queen Christina of Sweden (1626-89) and her Court
- Language: English
- Subject: History of Philosophy
- Publisher: Oxford University Press
- Publication date: 1988
- Publication place: United Kingdom
- Media type: Print (Hardcover and Paperback)
- Pages: 244
- ISBN: 0-19-289190-1

The Rationalists is a 1988 book by the philosopher John Cottingham, in which the author offers an overview of the most important exponents of rationalism, namely René Descartes, Baruch Spinoza and Gottfried Wilhelm Leibniz. Other thinkers, such as Nicolas Malebranche, are also dealt with.

== Reception ==
Robert Imlay, of the University of Toronto, found—that for its limited aims and intended audience — the book was a "real tour de force" and thought that it would make the good base to structure an undergraduate course on the rationalists.
