= Rules for the Direction of the Mind =

Unfinished book by René Descartes

- Author: René Descartes
- Original title: Rēgulae ad dīrectiōnem ingeniī
- Language: Latin
- Subject: Philosophy and autobiography
- Publication date: 1701
- Original text: Rēgulae ad dīrectiōnem ingeniī at Latin Wikisource
- Translation: Rules for the Direction of the Mind at Wikisource

Regulae ad directionem ingenii, or Rules for the Direction of the Mind is an unfinished treatise regarding the proper method for scientific and philosophical thinking by René Descartes. Descartes started writing the work in 1628, and it was eventually published in 1701 after Descartes' death. This treatise outlined the basis for his later work on complex problems of mathematics, geometry, science, and philosophy. The work is estimated to have been written over approximately 10 years, and as such Descartes shifted in his utilization and definition of these rules. Rules for the Direction of the Mind is described as a precursor and 'scrapbook' for his other workings and methods.

36 rules were planned in total. Rules 1-12 deal with the definition of science, the principal operations of the scientific method (intuition, deduction, and enumeration), and what Descartes terms "simple propositions", which "occur to us spontaneously" and which are objects of certain and evident cognition or intuition. Rules 13–24 deal with what Descartes terms "perfectly understood problems", or problems in which all of the conditions relevant to the solution of the problem are known, and which arise principally in arithmetic and geometry. Rules 25–36 deal with "imperfectly understood problems", or problems in which one or more conditions relevant to the solution of the problem are not known, but must be found. These problems arise for the most part in natural philosophy and metaphysics. However, the work ends prematurely at rule 21.

== Rules ==
| # | Rule |
|---|---|
| I | The aim of our studies must be the direction of our mind so that it may form solid and true judgments on whatever matters arise. |
| II | We must occupy ourselves only with those objects that our intellectual powers appear competent to know certainly and indubitably. |
| III | As regards any subject we propose to investigate, we must inquire not what other people have thought, or what we conjecture, but what we can clearly and manifestly perceive by intuition or deduce with certainty. For there is no other way of acquiring knowledge. |
| IV | There is a need for of a method for finding out the truth. |
| V | Method consists entirely in the order and disposition of the objects towards which our mental vision must be directed if we would find out any truth. We shall comply with it exactly if we reduce involved and obscure propositions step by step to those that are simpler, and then starting with the intuitive apprehension of all those that are absolutely simple, attempt to ascend to the knowledge of all others by precisely similar steps. |
| VI | In order to separate out what is quite simple from what is complex, and to arrange these matters methodically, we ought, in the case of every series in which we have deduced certain facts one from the other, to notice which fact is simple, and to mark the interval, greater, less, or equal, which separates all the others from this. |
| VII | If we wish our science to be complete, those matters which promote the end we have in view must one and all be scrutinized by a movement of thought which is continuous and nowhere interrupted; they must also be included in an enumeration which is both adequate and methodical. |
| VIII | If in the matters to be examined we come to a step in the series of which our understanding is not sufficiently well able to have an intuitive cognition, we must stop short there. We must not attempt to examine what follows; thus we shall spare ourselves superfluous labour. |
| IX | We ought to give the whole of our attention to the most insignificant and most easily mastered facts, and remain a long time in contemplation of them until we are accustomed to behold the truth clearly and distinctly. |
| X | In order that it may acquire sagacity the mind should be exercised in pursuing just those inquiries of which the solution has already been found by others; and it ought to traverse in a systematic way even the most trifling of men's inventions though those ought to be preferred in which order is explained or implied. |
| XI | If, after we have recognized intuitively a number of simple truths, we wish to draw any inference from them, it is useful to run them over in a continuous and uninterrupted act of thought, to reflect upon their relations to one another, and to grasp together distinctly a number of these propositions so far as is possible at the same time. For this is a way of making our knowledge much more certain, and of greatly increasing the power of the mind. |
| XII | Finally we ought to employ all the help of understanding, imagination, sense and memory, first for the purpose of having a distinct intuition of simple propositions; partly also in order to compare the propositions. |
| XIII | If we perfectly understand a problem we must abstract it from every superfluous conception, reduce it to its simplest terms and, by means of an enumeration, divide it up into the smallest possible parts. |
| XIV | The problem should be re-expressed in terms of the real extension of bodies and should be pictured in our imagination entirely by means of bare figures. Thus it will be perceived much more distinctly by our intellect. |
| XV | It is generally helpful if we draw these figures and display them before our external senses. In this way it will be easier for us to keep our mind alert. |
| XVI | As for things that do not require immediate attention from the mind, however necessary they may be for the conclusion, it is better to represent them with very concise symbols rather than complete figures. It will thus be impossible for our memory to go wrong, and our mind will not be distracted by having to retain these while it is taken up with deducing other matters. |

== See also ==
- Mathesis universalis
- Philosophy of mind
