= Discourse on Metaphysics =

1686 treatise by Gottfried Wilhelm Leibniz

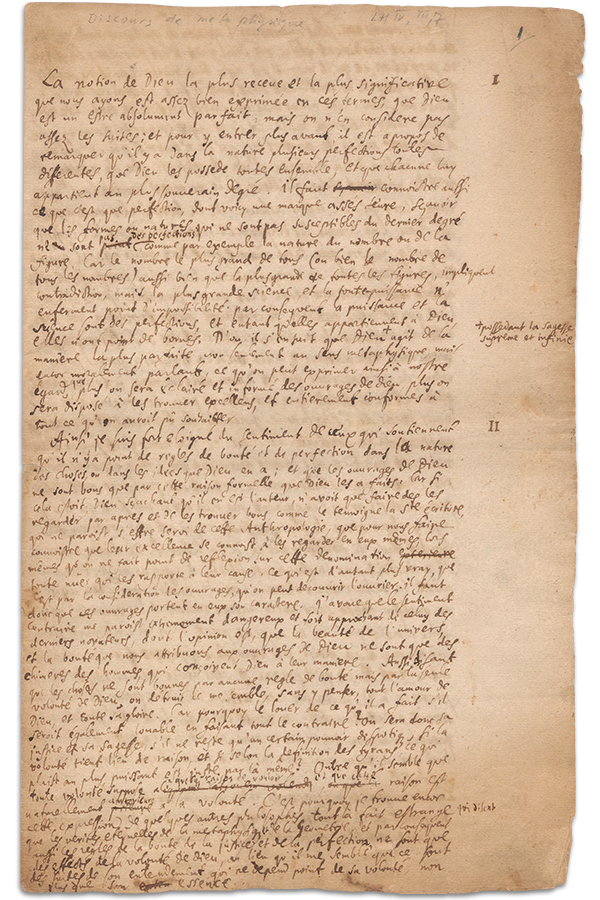
- First page of the original manuscript of Leibniz's Discourse on Metaphysics, composed in 1686
- Author: Gottfried Wilhelm Leibniz
- Original title: Discours de métaphysique
- Language: French
- Subject: Metaphysics
- Published: 1846
- Publication place: Germany
- Media type: Print

The Discourse on Metaphysics (French: Discours de métaphysique, 1686) is a short treatise by Gottfried Wilhelm Leibniz in which he develops a philosophy concerning physical substance, motion and resistance of bodies, and God's role within the universe. It is one of the few texts presenting in a consistent form the earlier philosophy of Leibniz.

The Discourse is closely connected to the epistolary discussion which he carried with Antoine Arnauld. However Leibniz refrained from sending the full text and it remained unpublished until the mid 19th century. Arnauld received only an abridged version in 37 points which resumed whole paragraphs and steered their discussion.

== Contents ==
§ 1. On Divine Perfection, and That God Does Everything in the Most Desirable Way.
§ 2. Against Those Who Claim That There Is No Goodness in God's Works, or That the Rules of Goodness and Beauty Are Arbitrary.
§ 3. Against Those Who Believe That God Might Have Made Things Better.
§ 4. That the Love of God Requires Our Complete Satisfaction and Acquiescence with Respect to What He Has Done without Our Being Quietists as a Result.
§ 5. What the Rules of the Perfection of Divine Conduct Consist in, and That the Simplicity of the Ways Is in Balance with the Richness of the Effects.
§ 6. God Does Nothing Which Is Not Orderly and It Is Not Even Possible to Imagine Events That Are Not Regular.
§ 7. That Miracles Conform to the General Order, Even Though They May Be Contra?), to the Subordinate Maxims; and about What God Wills or Permits by a General or Particular Volition.
§ 8. To Distinguish the Actions of God from Those of Creatures We Explain the Notion of an Individual Substance.
§ 9. That Each Singular Substance Expresses the Whole Universe in Its Own Way, and That All Its Events, Together with All Their Circumstances and the Whole Sequence of External Things, Are Included in Its Notion.
§ 10. That the Belief in Substantial Forms Has Some Basis, but That These Forms Do Not Change Anything in the Phenomena and Must Not Be Used to Explain Particular Effects.
§ 11. That the Thoughts of the Theologians and Philosophers Who Are Called Scholastics Are Not Entirely to Be Disdained.
§ 12. That the Notions Involved in Extension Contain Something Imaginary and Cannot Constitute the Substance of Body.
§ 13. Since the Individual Notion of Each Person Includes Once and for All Everything That Will Ever Happen to Him, One Sees in It the A Priori Proofs of the Truth of Each Event, or, Why One Happened Rather Than Another. But These Truths, However Certain, Are Nevertheless Contingent, Being Based on the Free Will of God or of His Creatures, Whose Choice Always Has Its Reasons, Which Incline without Necessitating.
§ 14. God Produces Various Substances According to the Different Views He Has of the Universe, and through God's Intervention the Proper Nature of Each Substance Brings It about That What Happens to One Corresponds with What Happens to All the Others, without Their Acting upon One Another Directly.
§ 15. The Action of One Finite Substance on Another Consists Only in the Increase of Degree of its Expression Together with the Diminution of the Expression of the Other, Insofar as God Requires Them to Accommodate Themselves to One Another.
§ 16. God's Extraordinary Concourse Is Included in That Which Our Essence Expresses, for This Expression Extends to Everything. But This Concourse Surpasses the Powers of Our Nature or of Our Distinct Expression, Which Is Finite and Follows Certain Subordinate Maxims.
§ 17. An Example of a Subordinate Maxim or Law of Nature; in Which It Is Shown, against the Cartesians and Many Others, That God Always Conserves the Same Force but Not the Same Quantity of Motion.
§ 18. The Distinction between Force and Quantity of Motion Is Important, among Other Reasons, for Judging That One Must Have Recourse to Metaphysical Considerations Distinct from Extension in Order to Explain the Phenomena of Bodies.
§ 19. The Utility of Final Causes in Physics.
§ 20. A Noteworthy Passage by Socrates in Plato against the Philosophers Who Are Overly Materialistic.
§ 21. If Mechanical Rules Depended Only on Geometry without Metaphysics, the Phenomena Would Be Entirely Different.
§ 22. Reconciliation of Two Ways of Explaining Things, by Final Causes and by Efficient Causes, in Order to Satisfy Both Those Who Explain Nature Mechanically and Those Who Have Recourse to Incorporeal Natures.
§ 23. To Return to Immaterial Substances, We Explain How God Acts on the Understanding of Minds and Whether We Always Have the Idea of That About Which We Think.
§ 24. What Is Clear or Obscure, Distinct or Confused, Adequate and Intuitive or Suppositive Knowledge; Nominal, Real, Causal, and Essential Definition.
§ 25. In What Case Our Knowledge Is Joined to the Contemplation of the Idea.
§ 26. That We Have All Ideas in Us; and of Plato's Doctrine of Reminiscence.
§ 27. How Our Soul Can Be Compared to Empty Tablets and How Our Notions Come from the Senses.
§ 28. God Alone Is the Immediate Object of Our Perceptions, Which Exist Outside of Us, and He Alone Is Our Light.
§ 29. Yet We Think Immediately through Our Own Ideas and Not through Those of God.
§ 30. How God Inclines Our Soul without Necessitating It; That We Do Not Have the Right to Complain and That We Must Not Ask Why Judas Sins but Only Why Judas the Sinner Is Admitted to Existence in Preference to Some Other Possible Persons. On Original Imperfection before Sin and on the Degrees of Grace
§ 31. On the Motives of Election, on Faith Foreseen, on Middle Knowledge, on the Absolute Decree and That It All Reduces to the Reason Why God Has Chosen for Existence Such a Possible Person Whose Notion Includes Just Such a Sequence of Graces and Free Acts; This Puts an End to All Difficulties at Once.
§ 32. The Utility of These Principles in Matters of Piety and Religion.
§ 33. Explanation of the Union of Soul and Body, a Matter Which Has Been Considered as Inexplicable or Miraculous, and on the Origin of Confused Perceptions.
§ 34. On the Difference between Minds and Other Substances, Souls or Substantial Forms, and That the Immortality Required Includes Memory.
§ 35. The Excellence of Minds and That God Considers Them Preferable to Other Creatures. That Minds Express God Rather Than the World, but That the Other Substances Express the World Rather Than God.
§ 36. God Is the Monarch of the Most Perfect Republic, Composed of All Minds, and the Happiness of This City of God Is His Principal Purpose.
§ 37. Jesus Christ Has Revealed to Men the Mystery and Admirable Laws of the Kingdom of Heaven and the Greatness of the Supreme Happiness That God Prepares for Those Who Love Him.

== Summary ==
The metaphysical considerations proceed from God to the substantial world and back to the spiritual realm. The starting point for the work is the conception of God as an absolutely perfect being (I), that God is good but goodness exists independently of God (a rejection of divine command theory) (II), and that God has created the world in an ordered and perfect fashion (III–VII).

At the time of its writing Discourse made the controversial claim That the opinions of... scholastic philosophers are not to be wholly despised (XI). Early work in modern philosophy during the 17th century were based on a rejection of many of the precepts of medieval philosophy. Leibniz saw the failures of scholasticism merely as one of rigor. [If] some careful and meditative mind were to take the trouble to clarify and direct their thoughts in the manner of analytic geometers, he would find a great treasure of important truths, wholly demonstrable.

Leibniz claimed that God's omnipotence was in no way impugned by the thought of evil, but was rather solidified. He endorsed the view that God chose the best of all possible worlds. In other words, Leibniz believed this world (or reality) to be the best there possibly could be — taking all facts into account, no better world could be imagined, even if we believed that we could think of something more perfect.

Leibniz's conception of physical substance is expanded upon in The Monadology and Principles of Nature and Grace.

== See also ==
- Problem of future contingents
