= John Cottingham =

British philosopher

John Cottingham (born 1943) is an English philosopher. The focus of his research has been early-modern philosophy (especially Descartes), the philosophy of religion and moral philosophy. He is a Professor Emeritus of Philosophy at the University of Reading, Professorial Research Fellow at Heythrop College, University of London, and Honorary Fellow of St John's College, Oxford. He is also a current Visiting Professor to the Philosophy Department at King's College, London.

Cottingham has served as editor of the journal Ratio, president of the Aristotelian Society, of the British Society for the Philosophy of Religion, of the Mind Association and as Chairman of the British Society for the History of Philosophy. A Festschrift with responses by Cottingham, The Moral Life, was published by Palgrave in 2008.

== Education ==
Born in London, Cottingham was educated at Merchant Taylors' School, Northwood (London) and St John's College, Oxford. In 1973, he completed a DPhil at the University of Oxford with a thesis on Descartes under Anthony Kenny.

== Research ==
=== Descartes ===
Cottingham introduced trialism as an alternative interpretation of the mind–body dualism of Descartes. Although composed of two substances, mind and body, the human being possesses distinctive attributes in its own right (including sensations, passions, emotions), and these form a third category, that cannot be reduced to thought or extension. Cottingham has also argued that Descartes's view of animals as machines does not have the reductionistic implications commonly supposed. Finally, Cottingham has explored the importance of Descartes as a moral philosopher, with a comprehensive picture of the good life that draws both on his scientific work (in physiology and psychology) and also on the theistic outlook that informs all his philosophy. Cottingham is co-editor and translator of the three-volume Cambridge edition of The Philosophical Writings of Descartes.

=== Moral philosophy and philosophy of religion ===
Cottingham criticizes a putative psychological impoverishment of contemporary moral philosophy, and argues that any plausible theory of a good and integrated life for human beings needs to draw on the insights available from a broadly psychoanalytic perspective. His work on partiality defends the importance of self-concern as a central ingredient in virtue. In On the Meaning of Life, he addresses the relationship between moral, aesthetic and religious modes of awareness in constituting a meaningful life. Cottingham's more recent work in the philosophy of religion argues for the primacy of the moral and spiritual aspects of religious allegiance over theoretical and doctrinal components.

== Selected works ==
- (2020) In Search of the Soul, Princeton University Press.
- (2015) How to Believe, Bloomsbury.
- (2009) Why Believe? Continuum
- (2008) Cartesian Reflections, Oxford University Press
- (2007) Western Philosophy, Blackwell
- (2005) The Spiritual Dimension, Cambridge University Press
- (2003) On the Meaning of Life, Routledge
- (1998) Philosophy and the good life: reason and the passions in Greek, Cartesian and psychoanalytic ethics, Cambridge University Press
- (1997) Descartes's Philosophy of Mind, Orion
- (1988) The Rationalists, Oxford University Press
- (1986) Descartes, Blackwell
