= Alphabet of human thought =

Hypothetical language created by Gottfried Wilhelm Leibniz

The alphabet of human thought (Latin: alphabetum cogitationum humanarum) is a concept originally proposed by Gottfried Wilhelm Leibniz that provides a universal way to represent and analyze ideas and relationships by breaking down their component pieces. All ideas are compounded from a very small number of simple ideas which can be represented by a unique character.

== Overview ==
Logic was Leibniz's earliest philosophic interest, going back to his teens. René Descartes had suggested that the lexicon of a universal language should consist of primitive elements. The systematic combination of these elements, according to syntactical rules, would generate the infinite combinations of computational structures required to represent human language. In this way Descartes and Leibniz were precursors to computational linguistics as defined by Noam Chomsky.

In the early 18th century, Leibniz outlined his characteristica universalis, an artificial language in which grammatical and logical structure would coincide, allowing reasoning to be reduced to calculation. Leibniz acknowledged the work of Ramon Llull, particularly the Ars generalis ultima (1305), as one of the inspirations for this idea. The basic elements of his characteristica would be pictographic characters unambiguously representing a limited number of elementary concepts. Leibniz called the inventory of these concepts "the alphabet of human thought." There are quite a few mentions of the characteristica in Leibniz's writings, but he never set out any details save for a brief outline of some possible sentences in his Dissertation on the Art of Combinations.

His main interest was what is known in modern logic as classification and composition. In modern terminology, Leibniz's alphabet was a proposal for an automated theorem prover or ontology classification reasoner written centuries before the technology to implement them.

== Semantic web implementation ==
John Giannandrea, co-founder and CTO of Metaweb Technologies, acknowledged in a 2008 speech that Freebase was at least linked to the alphabet of human thought, if not an implementation of it.

== See also ==
- Algebraic logic – Reasoning about equations with free variables
- An Essay Towards a Real Character, and a Philosophical Language – Book by John Wilkins
- Language of thought hypothesis – Hypothesis of philosopher Jerry Fodor
- Natural semantic metalanguage – Linguistic theory of semantic description
- Philosophical language – Any constructed language that is constructed from first principles
- Upper ontology – Ontology applicable across domains of knowledge

== External weblinks ==
- "In the 17th Century, Leibniz Dreamed of a Machine That Could Calculate Ideas". IEEE Spectrum. 2019-11-04.
