= Trialism =

Philosophical theory of the mind

Trialism in philosophy was introduced by John Cottingham as an alternative interpretation of the mind–body dualism of Descartes. Trialism keeps the two substances of mind and body, but introduces a third substance, sensation, belonging to the union of mind and body. This allows animals, which do not think like humans, to be regarded as having sensations and not as being mere automata.

== Background ==
Cottingham introduced this term after noting that Descartes' account of sensation and imagination has placed his official dualism under considerable pressure: "Partly as a result of this, we often see the emergence, in Descartes’ writings on human psychology, of a grouping of not two but three notions – not a dualism but what may be called a ‘trialism’." According to Cottingham, Descartes added the third notion of sensation "alongside thought and extension without proceeding to reify it as a separate substance". Thinkers such as Daniel Garber and Tad Schmaltz supported this by citing a letter in the correspondence between Descartes and Princess Elizabeth of Bohemia, which indicated that he changed his mind from a dualistic view. This submind acts as an intermediate substance between the mind and the body, which permits interaction between both substances. Derician trialism is also proposed as a solution to the hard problem of consciousness of David Chalmers and the Molyneux's problem of William Molyneux.

== Sources ==
- Cottingham, J. Cartesian Trialism, Mind, 1985.
