= Existential graph =

Type of diagrammatic notation for propositional logic

An existential graph is a type of diagrammatic or visual notation for logical expressions, created by Charles Sanders Peirce, who wrote on graphical logic as early as 1882, and continued to develop the method until his death in 1914. They include both a separate graphical notation for logical statements and a logical calculus, a formal system of rules of inference that can be used to derive theorems.

== Background ==
Peirce found the algebraic notation (i.e. symbolic notation) of logic, especially that of predicate logic, which was still very new during his lifetime and which he himself played a major role in developing, to be philosophically unsatisfactory, because the symbols had their meaning by mere convention. In contrast, he strove for a style of writing in which the signs literally carry their meaning within them – in the terminology of his theory of signs: a system of iconic signs that resemble or resemble the represented objects and relations.

Thus, the development of an iconic, graphic and – as he intended – intuitive and easy-to-learn logical system was a project that Peirce worked on throughout his life. After at least one aborted approach – the "Entitative Graphs" – the closed system of "Existential Graphs" finally emerged from 1896 onwards. Although considered by their creator to be a clearly superior and more intuitive system, as a mode of writing and as a calculus, they had no major influence on the history of logic. This has been attributed to the fact(s) that, for one, Peirce published little on this topic, and that the published texts were not written in a very understandable way; and, for two, that the linear formula notation in the hands of experts is actually the less complex tool. Hence, the existential graphs received little attention or were seen as unwieldy. From 1963 onwards, works by Don D. Roberts and J. Jay Zeman, in which Peirce's graphic systems were systematically examined and presented, led to a better understanding; even so, they have today found practical use within only one modern application—the conceptual graphs introduced by John F. Sowa in 1976, which are used in computer science to represent knowledge. However, existential graphs are increasingly reappearing as a subject of research in connection with a growing interest in graphical logic, which is also expressed in attempts to replace the rules of inference given by Peirce with more intuitive ones.

The overall system of existential graphs is composed of three subsystems that build on each other, the alpha graphs, the beta graphs and the gamma graphs. The alpha graphs are a purely propositional logical system. Building on this, the beta graphs are a first order logical calculus. The gamma graphs, which have not yet been fully researched and were not completed by Peirce, are understood as a further development of the alpha and beta graphs. When interpreted appropriately, the gamma graphs cover higher-level predicate logic as well as modal logic. As late as 1903, Peirce began a new approach, the "Tinctured Existential Graphs," with which he wanted to replace the previous systems of alpha, beta and gamma graphs and combine their expressiveness and performance in a single new system. Like the gamma graphs, the "Tinctured Existential Graphs" remained unfinished.

As calculi, the alpha, beta and gamma graphs are sound (i.e., all expressions derived as graphs are semantically valid). The alpha and beta graphs are also complete (i.e., all propositional or predicate-logically semantically valid expressions can be derived as alpha or beta graphs).

== The graphs ==
Peirce proposed three systems of existential graphs:

- alpha, isomorphic to propositional logic and the two-element Boolean algebra;
- beta, isomorphic to first-order logic with identity, with all formulas closed;
- gamma, (nearly) isomorphic to normal modal logic.

Alpha nests in beta and gamma. Beta does not nest in gamma, quantified modal logic being more general than put forth by Peirce.

=== Alpha ===
Alpha graphs

The syntax is:

- The blank page;
- Single letters or phrases written anywhere on the page;
- Any graph may be enclosed by a simple closed curve called a cut or sep. A cut can be empty. Cuts can nest and concatenate at will, but must never intersect.

Any well-formed part of a graph is a subgraph.

The semantics are:

- The blank page denotes Truth;
- Letters, phrases, subgraphs, and entire graphs may be True or False;
- To enclose a subgraph with a cut is equivalent to logical negation or Boolean complementation. Hence an empty cut denotes False;
- All subgraphs within a given cut are tacitly conjoined.

Hence the alpha graphs are a minimalist notation for sentential logic, grounded in the expressive adequacy of And and Not. The alpha graphs constitute a radical simplification of the two-element Boolean algebra and the truth functors.

The depth of an object is the number of cuts that enclose it.

Rules of inference:

- Insertion - Any subgraph may be inserted into an odd numbered depth. The surrounding white page is depth 1. Depth 2 are the black letters and lines that encircle elements. Depth 3 is entering the next white area in an enclosed element.
- Erasure - Any subgraph in an even numbered depth may be erased.

Rules of equivalence:

- Double cut - A pair of cuts with nothing between them may be drawn around any subgraph. Likewise two nested cuts with nothing between them may be erased. This rule is equivalent to Boolean involution and double negation elimination.
- Iteration/Deiteration – To understand this rule, it is best to view a graph as a tree structure having nodes and ancestors. Any subgraph P in node n may be copied into any node depending on n. Likewise, any subgraph P in node n may be erased if there exists a copy of P in some node ancestral to n (i.e., some node on which n depends). For an equivalent rule in an algebraic context, see C2 in Laws of Form.

A proof manipulates a graph by a series of steps, with each step justified by one of the above rules. If a graph can be obtained by steps from the blank page, it is what is now called a tautology. If a graph can be reduced by steps to an empty cut, it is a contradiction. Graphs that cannot be simplified beyond a certain point are analogues of the satisfiable formulas of first-order logic.

=== Beta ===
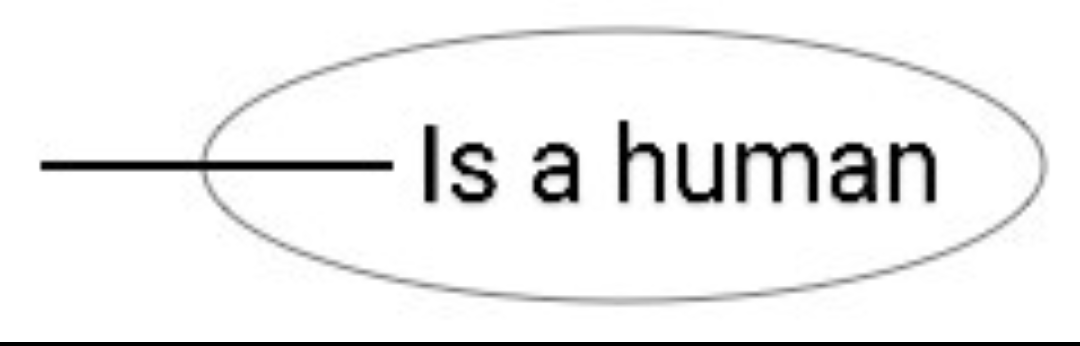
Existential graph of the statement "There is something that is not a human"

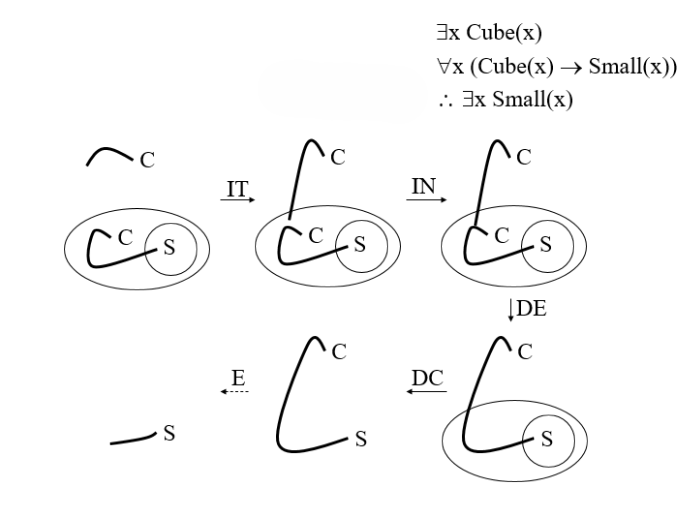
beta existential graphs

In the case of betagraphs, the atomic expressions are no longer propositional letters (P, Q, R,...) or statements ("It rains," "Peirce died in poverty"), but predicates in the sense of predicate logic (see there for more details), possibly abbreviated to predicate letters (F, G, H,...). A predicate in the sense of predicate logic is a sequence of words with clearly defined spaces that becomes a propositional sentence if you insert a proper noun into each space. For example, the word sequence "_ is a human" is a predicate because it gives rise to the declarative sentence "Peirce is a human" if you enter the proper name "Peirce" in the blank space. Likewise, the word sequence "__{1} is richer than __{2}" is a predicate, because it results in the statement "Socrates is richer than Plato" if the proper names "Socrates" or "Plato" are inserted into the spaces.

=== Notation of betagraphs ===
The basic language device is the line of identity, a thickly drawn line of any form. The identity line docks onto the blank space of a predicate to show that the predicate applies to at least one individual. In order to express that the predicate "_ is a human being" applies to at least one individual – i.e. to say that there is (at least) one human being – one writes an identity line in the blank space of the predicate "_ is a human being:"

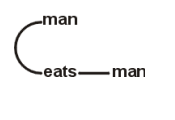
Existential graph of the statement "Some man eats a man"

The beta graphs can be read as a system in which all formula are to be taken as closed, because all variables are implicitly quantified. If the "shallowest" part of a line of identity has even depth, the associated variable is tacitly existentially (universally) quantified.

Zeman (1964) was the first to note that the beta graphs are isomorphic to first-order logic with equality (also see Zeman 1967). However, the secondary literature, especially Roberts (1973) and Shin (2002), does not agree on how this is. Peirce's writings do not address this question, because first-order logic was first clearly articulated only after his death, in the 1928 first edition of David Hilbert and Wilhelm Ackermann's Principles of Mathematical Logic.

=== Gamma ===
Add to the syntax of alpha a second kind of simple closed curve, written using a dashed rather than a solid line. Peirce proposed rules for this second style of cut, which can be read as the primitive unary operator of modal logic.

Zeman (1964) was the first to note that the gamma graphs are equivalent to the well-known modal logics S4 and S5. Hence the gamma graphs can be read as a peculiar form of normal modal logic. This finding of Zeman's has received little attention to this day, but is nonetheless included here as a point of interest.

== Peirce's role ==
The existential graphs are a curious offspring of Peirce the logician/mathematician with Peirce the founder of a major strand of semiotics. Peirce's graphical logic is but one of his many accomplishments in logic and mathematics. In a series of papers beginning in 1867, and culminating with his classic paper in the 1885 American Journal of Mathematics, Peirce developed much of the two-element Boolean algebra, propositional calculus, quantification and the predicate calculus, and some rudimentary set theory. Model theorists consider Peirce the first of their kind. He also extended De Morgan's relation algebra. He stopped short of metalogic (which eluded even Principia Mathematica).

But Peirce's evolving semiotic theory led him to doubt the value of logic formulated using conventional linear notation, and to prefer that logic and mathematics be notated in two (or even three) dimensions. His work went beyond Euler's diagrams and Venn's 1880 revision thereof. Frege's 1879 work Begriffsschrift also employed a two-dimensional notation for logic, but one very different from Peirce's.

Peirce's first published paper on graphical logic (reprinted in Vol. 3 of his Collected Papers) proposed a system dual (in effect) to the alpha existential graphs, called the entitative graphs. He very soon abandoned this formalism in favor of the existential graphs. In 1911 Victoria, Lady Welby showed the existential graphs to C. K. Ogden who felt they could usefully be combined with Welby's thoughts in a "less abstruse form." Otherwise they attracted little attention during his life and were invariably denigrated or ignored after his death, until the PhD theses by Roberts (1964) and Zeman (1964).

== See also ==
- Nor operator
- Conceptual graph
- Charles Sanders Peirce
- Propositional calculus
