= Characteristica universalis =

Leibnizian universal language concept

The Latin term characteristica universalis, commonly interpreted as universal characteristic, or universal character in English, is a universal and formal language imagined by Gottfried Leibniz able to express mathematical, scientific, and metaphysical concepts. Leibniz thus hoped to create a language usable within the framework of a universal logical calculation or calculus ratiocinator.

The characteristica universalis is a recurring concept in the writings of Leibniz. When writing in French, he sometimes employed the phrase spécieuse générale to the same effect. The concept is sometimes paired with his notion of a calculus ratiocinator and with his plans for an encyclopaedia as a compendium of all human knowledge.

== Uses ==
=== International communication ===
Many Leibniz scholars writing in English seem to agree that he intended his characteristica universalis or "universal character" to be a form of pasigraphy, or ideographic language. This was to be based on a rationalised version of the 'principles' of Chinese characters, as Europeans understood these characters in the seventeenth century. From this perspective it is common to find the characteristica universalis associated with contemporary universal language projects like Esperanto, auxiliary languages like Interlingua, and formal logic projects like Frege's Begriffsschrift. The global expansion of European commerce in Leibniz's time provided mercantilist motivations for a universal language of trade so that traders could communicate with any natural language.

Others, such as Jaenecke, for example, have observed that Leibniz also had other intentions for the characteristica universalis, and these aspects appear to be a source of the aforementioned vagueness and inconsistency in modern interpretations. According to Jaenecke,

the Leibniz project is not a matter of logic but rather one of knowledge representation, a field largely unexploited in today's logic-oriented epistemology and philosophy of science. It is precisely this one-sided orientation of these disciplines, which is responsible for the distorted picture of Leibniz's work found in the literature.

— Jaenecke 1996

As Louis Couturat wrote, Leibniz criticized the linguistic systems of George Dalgarno and John Wilkins for this reason since they focused on

...practical uses rather than scientific utility, that is, for being chiefly artificial languages intended for international communication and not philosophical languages that would express the logical relations of concepts. He favors, and opposes to them, the true "real characteristic", which would express the composition of concepts by the combination of signs representing their simple elements, such that the correspondence between composite ideas and their symbols would be natural and no longer conventional.

— Couturat, 1901, chpt. 3

=== A universal language of science ===
Leibniz said that his goal was an alphabet of human thought, a universal symbolic language (characteristic) for science, mathematics, and metaphysics. According to Couturat, "In May 1676, he once again identified the universal language with the characteristic and dreamed of a language that would also be a calculus—a sort of algebra of thought" (1901, chp 3.). This characteristic was a universalisation of the various "real characteristics". Couturat wrote that Leibniz gave Egyptian and Chinese hieroglyphics and chemical signs as examples of real characteristics writing:

This shows that the real characteristic was for him an ideography, that is, a system of signs that directly represent things (or, rather, ideas) and not words, in such a way that each nation could read them and translate them into its own language.

— Couturat, 1901, chpt. 3

In a footnote, Couturat added:

Elsewhere Leibniz even includes among the types of signs musical notes and astronomical signs (the signs of the zodiac and those of the planets, including the sun and the moon). It should be noted that Leibniz sometimes employs planetary signs in place of letters in his algebraic calculations

— Couturat, 1901, chpt. 3

=== Metaphysics ===
Hartley Rogers emphasised the metaphysical aspect of the characteristica universalis by relating it to the "elementary theory of the ordering of the reals," defining it as "a precisely definable system for making statements of science" (Rogers 1963: 934). Universal language projects like Esperanto, and formal logic projects like Frege's Begriffsschrift are not commonly concerned with the epistemic synthesis of empirical science, mathematics, pictographs and metaphysics in the way Leibniz described. Hence scholars have had difficulty in showing how projects such as the Begriffsschrift and Esperanto embody the full vision Leibniz had for his characteristica.

The writings of Alexander Gode suggested that Leibniz' characteristica had a metaphysical bias which prevented it from reflecting reality faithfully. Gode emphasized that Leibniz established certain goals or functions first, and then developed the characteristica to fulfill those functions.

=== Science ===
In the domain of science, Leibniz aimed for his characteristica to form diagrams or pictures, depicting any system at any scale, and understood by all regardless of native language. Leibniz wrote:

And although learned men have long since thought of some kind of language or universal characteristic by which all concepts and things can be put into beautiful order, and with whose help different nations might communicate their thoughts and each read in his own language what another has written in his, yet no one has attempted a language or characteristic which includes at once both the arts of discovery and judgement, that is, one whose signs and characters serve the same purpose that arithmetical signs serve for numbers, and algebraic signs for quantities taken abstractly. Yet it does seem that since God has bestowed these two sciences on mankind, he has sought to notify us that a far greater secret lies hidden in our understanding, of which these are but the shadows.

— Leibniz, Zur allgemeinen Charakteristik. Hauptschriften zur Grundlegung der Philosophie. Philosophische Werke Band 1. page 30-31. Translated by Artur Buchenau. Reviewed and with introduction and notes published by Ernst Cassirer. Hamburg: Felix Meiner. 1966. (Unless stated otherwise, all Leibniz quotations are from his On the General Characteristic as translated in Loemker 1969: 221–25. This passage is from p. 222.)

P. P. Weiner raised an example of a large scale application of Leibniz's characteristica to climatic science. A weather-forecaster invented by Athanasius Kircher "interested Leibniz in connection with his own attempts to invent a universal language" (1940).

Leibniz talked about his dream of a universal scientific language at the very dawn of his career, as follows:

We have spoken of the art of complication of the sciences, i.e., of inventive logic... But when the tables of categories of our art of complication have been formed, something greater will emerge. For let the first terms, of the combination of which all others consist, be designated by signs; these signs will be a kind of alphabet. It will be convenient for the signs to be as natural as possible—e.g., for one, a point; for numbers, points; for the relations of one entity with another, lines; for the variation of angles and of extremities in lines, kinds of relations. If these are correctly and ingeniously established, this universal writing will be as easy as it is common, and will be capable of being read without any dictionary; at the same time, a fundamental knowledge of all things will be obtained. The whole of such a writing will be made of geometrical figures, as it were, and of a kind of pictures — just as the ancient Egyptians did, and the Chinese do today. Their pictures, however, are not reduced to a fixed alphabet... with the result that a tremendous strain on the memory is necessary, which is the contrary of what we propose.

— On The Art of Combination, 1666, translated in Parkinson 1966: 10–11

Nicholas Rescher, reviewing Cohen's 1954 article, wrote that:

Leibniz's program of a universal science (scientia universalis) for coordinating all human knowledge into a systematic whole comprises two parts: (1) a universal notation (characteristica universalis) by use of which any item of information whatever can be recorded in a natural and systematic way, and (2) a means of manipulating the knowledge thus recorded in a computational fashion, so as to reveal its logical interrelations and consequences (the calculus ratiocinator).

— Rescher 1954

Near the end of his life, Leibniz wrote that combining metaphysics with mathematics and science through a universal character would require creating what he called:

... a kind of general algebra in which all truths of reason would be reduced to a kind of calculus. At the same time, this would be a kind of universal language or writing, though infinitely different from all such languages which have thus far been proposed; for the characters and the words themselves would direct the mind, and the errors — excepting those of fact — would only be calculation mistakes. It would be very difficult to form or invent this language or characteristic, but very easy to learn it without any dictionaries.

— Leibniz, letter to Nicolas Remond, 10 January 1714, in Loemker 1969: 654. Translation revised.

The universal "representation" of knowledge would therefore combine lines and points with "a kind of pictures" (pictographs or logograms) to be manipulated by means of his calculus ratiocinator. He hoped his pictorial algebra would advance the scientific treatment of qualitative phenomena, thereby constituting "that science in which are treated the forms or formulas of things in general, that is, quality in general" (On Universal Synthesis and Analysis, 1679, in Loemker 1969: 233).

=== His diagrammatic reasoning ===
Basic elements of Leibniz's pictograms

Since the characteristica universalis is diagrammatic and employs pictograms (see picture), the diagrams in Leibniz's work warrant close study. On at least two occasions, Leibniz illustrated his philosophical reasoning with diagrams. One diagram, the frontispiece to his 1666 De Arte Combinatoria (On the Art of Combinations), represents the Aristotelian theory of how all material things are formed from combinations of the elements earth, water, air, and fire.

Leibniz's diagrammatic reasoning

These four elements make up the four corners of a diamond (see picture). Opposing pairs of these are joined by a bar labeled "contraries" (earth-air, fire-water). At the four corners of the superimposed square are the four qualities defining the elements. Each adjacent pair of these is joined by a bar labeled "possible combination"; the diagonals joining them are labeled "impossible combination". Starting from the top, fire is formed from the combination of dryness and heat; air from wetness and heat; water from coldness and wetness; earth from coldness and dryness. This diagram is reproduced in several texts including Saemtliche Schriften und Briefe (Saemtliche Schriften und Briefe, Reihe VI, Band 1: 166, Loemker 1969: 83, 366, Karl Popp and Erwin Stein 2000: 33).

=== Leibniz retraces his steps and makes a discovery ===
Leibniz rightly saw that creating the characteristica would be difficult, fixing the time required for devising it as follows: "I think that some selected men could finish the matter in five years" (Loemker 1969: 224), later remarking: "And so I repeat, what I have often said, that a man who is neither a prophet nor a prince can ever undertake any thing of greater good to mankind of more fitting for divine glory" (Loemker 1969: 225). But later in life, a more sober note emerged. In a March 1706 letter to the Electress Sophia of Hanover, the spouse of his patron, he wrote:

It is true that in the past I planned a new way of calculating suitable for matters which have nothing in common with mathematics, and if this kind of logic were put into practice, every reasoning, even probabilistic ones, would be like that of the mathematician: if need be, the lesser minds which had application and good will could, if not accompany the greatest minds, then at least follow them. For one could always say: let us calculate, and judge correctly through this, as much as the data and reason can provide us with the means for it. But I do not know if I will ever be in a position to carry out such a project, which requires more than one hand; and it even seems that mankind is still not mature enough to lay claim to the advantages which this method could provide.

— Strickland 2011: 355

In another 1714 letter to Nicholas Remond, he wrote:

I have spoken to the Marquis de l'Hôpital and others about my general algebra, but they have paid no more attention to it than if I had told them about a dream of mine. I should have to support it too by some obvious application, but to achieve this it would be necessary to work out at least a part of my characteristic, a task which is not easy, especially in my present condition and without the advantage of discussions with men who could stimulate and help me in work of this nature.

— Loemker 1969: 656

Eventually, by discovering binary digits again from Chinese works, which was now from the I Ching, Leibniz arrived at what he felt was a discovery of a link that would thereby create his characteristica universalis. It eventually created the foundations of symbolic logic and modern philosophy, specifically the predicate-based Analytic Philosophy and Boolean Logic.

== Three criteria ==
C. J. Cohen (1954) set out three criteria which any project for a philosophical language would need to meet before it could be considered a version of the characteristica universalis. In setting out these criteria, Cohen made reference to the concept of "logistic". This concept is not the same as that used in statistical analysis. In 1918, Clarence Irving Lewis, the first English-speaking logician to translate and discuss some of Leibniz's logical writings, elaborated on "logistic" as follows:

Logistic may be defined as the science which deals with types of order as such. It is not so much a subject as a method. Although most logistic is either founded upon or makes large use of the principles of symbolic logic, still a science of order in general does not necessarily presuppose or begin with symbolic logic.

— Lewis 1960: 3, 7–9 (Lewis here echoed the thinking of his teacher Josiah Royce; see "Order" in the 1951 Collected Logical Writings of Royce.)

Following from this Cohen stipulated that the universal character would have to serve as:

- An "international auxiliary language" enabling individuals speaking different languages to communicate with one another;
- Symbolism for the exact and systematic expression of all present knowledge, making possible a "logistic" treatment of science in general. This symbolism could also be expanded to accommodate future knowledge;
- An instrument of discovery and demonstration.

These criteria together with the notion of logistic reveal that Cohen and Lewis both associated the characteristica with the methods and objectives of general systems theory.

== A common scientific language ==
Inconsistency, vagueness, and a lack of specifics in both English language translations and modern English language interpretations of Leibniz's writings render a clear exposition difficult. As with Leibniz's calculus ratiocinator two different schools of philosophical thought have come to emphasise two different aspects that can be found in Leibniz's writing. The first point of view emphasizes logic and language, and is associated with analytic philosophy and rationalism. The second point of view is more in tune with Couturat's views as expressed above, which emphasize science and engineering. This point of view is associated with synthetic philosophy and empiricism. Either or both of these aspects Leibniz hoped would guide human reasoning like Ariadne's thread and thereby suggest solutions to many of humanity's urgent problems.

== Gödel alleges conspiracy ==
Because Leibniz never described the characteristica universalis in operational detail, many philosophers have deemed it an absurd fantasy. In this vein, Parkinson wrote:

Leibniz's views about the systematic character of all knowledge are linked with his plans for a universal symbolism, a Characteristica Universalis. This was to be a calculus which would cover all thought, and replace controversy by calculation. The ideal now seems absurdly optimistic..."

— Parkinson 1973: ix

The logician Kurt Gödel, on the other hand, believed that the characteristica universalis was feasible, and that its development would revolutionize mathematical practice (Dawson 1997). He noticed, however, that a detailed treatment of the characteristica was conspicuously absent from Leibniz's publications. It appears that Gödel assembled all of Leibniz's texts mentioning the characteristica, and convinced himself that some sort of systematic and conspiratorial censoring had taken place, a belief that became obsessional. Gödel may have failed to appreciate the magnitude of the task facing the editors of Leibniz's manuscripts, given that Leibniz left about 15,000 letters and 40,000 pages of other manuscripts. Even now, most of this huge Nachlass remains unpublished.

== Related 17th century projects ==
Others in the 17th century, such as George Dalgarno, attempted similar philosophical and linguistic projects, some under the heading of mathesis universalis. A notable example was John Wilkins, the author of An Essay towards a Real Character and a Philosophical Language, who wrote a thesaurus as a first step towards a universal language. He intended to add to his thesaurus an alphabet of human thought (an organisational scheme, similar to a thesaurus or the Dewey decimal system), and an "algebra of thought", allowing rule-based manipulation. The philosophers and linguists who undertook such projects often belonged to pansophical (universal knowledge) and scientific knowledge groups in London and Oxford, collectively known as the "Invisible College" and now seen as forerunners of the Royal Society.

== More recent projects ==
A wide variety of constructed languages have emerged over the past 150 years which may be seen as supporting some of Leibniz's intuitions.

- Raymond F. Piper (1957; 432–433) claimed that O.L. Reiser's Unified Symbolism for World Understanding in Science (1955), an expansion of his A Philosophy for World Unification (1946), was inspired by Leibniz's characteristica universalis, and believed necessary for world understanding and unbiased communications so that "war may eventually be eliminated and that a worldwide organism of peaceful human beings may gradually be established" (Piper Ibid.).
- The study of Boolean algebras and group theory in the 19th century proved correct Leibniz's intuition that algebraic methods could be used to reason about qualitative and non-numerical phenomena. Specifically, the members of the universal set of a Boolean algebra or group need not be numbers. Moreover, a fair bit of philosophy and theoretical science can be formalized as axiomatic theories embodying first-order logic and set theory. Note also how model theory has been employed to formalize and reason about such emphatically nonnumerical subjects as semantics and pragmatics of natural languages. But these approaches have yet to result in any pictographic notations.
- Fearnley-Sander (1986) went one step further, defining Leibniz's characteristica as a combination of the algebra of logic (which Fearnley-Sander defined as the calculus ratiocinator) and the algebra of geometry (defined as the characteristica geometrica). Fearnley-Sander suggested that this combination had "come to pass" with the rise of universal algebra. Some people other than Fearnley-Sander working in the area of "universal algebra", the study of the mathematical and logical properties of algebraic structures generally, do not believe that universal algebra has anything to do with the characteristica.
- Palko, Gy Bulcsu (1986) considered structured analysis for analyzing and designing hierarchic systems by using an iconic language, and suggested that such was an application of the universal characteristics Leibniz's project to the language of structured analysis and the formalization of an iconic control system.
- Kluge (1980) argued that Frege's landmark Begriffsschrift was consciously inspired by the characteristica universalis.
- Even though Charles Sanders Peirce, a founder of semiotics, believed that all reasoning was diagrammatic, the relation, if any, of the characteristica to his existential graphs and to semiotics has yet to be explored in the English literature.
- Several aspects of logical positivism, specifically:
  - The first-order theories of Rudolf Carnap's Aufbau (1928, English translation 1967) and of its successor, Goodman (1977), are Leibnizian in their sweep and ambition, although Leibniz would have taken strenuous exception to Carnap's resolute hostility to all metaphysics.
  - The unification of science movement of the 1930s, led by Otto Neurath, Rudolf Carnap, and Charles W. Morris, and later by Edward Haskell et al., bears comparison with the characteristica.
  - Otto Neurath's isotype pictogram system, and "international picture language".
- The following attempts to recast parts of theoretical science as axiomatic first-order theories can be viewed as attempts to develop parts of the characteristica:
  - Special relativity, by Hans Reichenbach, Rudolf Carnap, and others during the 1920s (Carnap 1958: 197–212);
  - Biology, by Joseph Woodger (1937), also during the 1930s (Carnap 1958: 213–20):
  - Mechanics, by Suppes (1957: 291–305) and others during the 1950s.
- The objectives of the 'Symbolator' or 'idea-computer' (Goppold 1994) resemble in some respects a less ambitious version of the characteristica universalis.
- Connections with the Jewish Cabbala, and the International auxiliary language policy of the Baháʼí Faith have also been made.
- The characteristic has also been claimed as an ancestor of the pictographic Energy Systems Language and associated Emergy Synthesis of Odum's Systems Ecology (Cevolatti and Maud, 2004). The Energy Systems Language combines lines and points with "a kind of pictures" manipulated by means of digital computers and software packages like EXTEND (Odum, Odum, and Peterson 1995), and Valyi's Emergy Simulator. It was designed to provide a general systems language affording quantitative accounting and mathematical simulation of qualitative energy relationships between ecological entities: "that science in which are treated the forms or formulas of things in general, that is, quality in general". A general algebra known as the emergy algebra emerged from the repeated use of this language in modelling and simulating the energetic principles of ecological relations. In particular it afforded the discovery and demonstration of the maximum power principle, suggested as the fourth law of thermodynamics. If this ancestral claim is granted, then simulation software like EXTEND and Valyi's Emergy Simulator can be seen as combining the characteristica and the calculus ratiocinator, if and only if the digital computer is interpreted as a physical embodiment of the calculus ratiocinator.
- The work of Mario Bunge on the border of physics and metaphysics seems grounded in metaphysical presuppositions similar to those of Leibniz's characteristica (Radnitzky 1981: 246).
- Jacob Linzbach's Transcendent Algebra, a pasigraphy designed to allow the "calculation of truth" through manipulation of given facts following basic principles much like those used in mathematics, was inspired by Leibniz's characteristica.
- Lojban (and its older version Loglan) are both artificial languages derived from predicate logic, and intended for use in human communication.
- Charles K. Bliss's Blissymbols or Blissymbolics, presently used as an 'alternative and augmentative language' for disabled people but originally intended as an International 'Auxlang', is said to be in the mold of the characteristica (Bliss 1978).
- Emoji, while still in their relative infancy, could be considered to be an early stage in the organic development of a universal logographic language.
- Ithkuil is a constructed language created by John Quijada, designed to express deeper levels of human cognition briefly yet overtly and clearly, particularly with regard to human categorization.
- The International Organization for Standardization (ISO), with a history going back to the 1920s, was founded under its current name in 1947 as a non-governmental organization with general consultative status with the United Nations Economic and Social Council. Its membership consists of the national standards bodies of 164 of the UN Member States. Based on the work of its over 250 technical committees, the ISO has issued over 20,000 standards for scientific terminology, names and abbreviations, weights and measures, and safety-related and other pictographs.
- The Unified Modeling Language (UML) is a general-purpose, developmental modeling language in the field of software engineering that is intended to provide a standard way to visualize the design of a system.
- Bennett, John G.; Bortoft, Henri; and Pledge, Kenneth: "Towards an Objectively Complete Language: An Essay in Objective Description as Applied to Scientific Procedure," Systematics: The Journal of the Institute for the Comparative Study of History, Philosophy and the Sciences, Vol. 3, No. 3, (December 1965), pp. 185–229.
- The International Phonetic Alphabet (IPA) is an alphabetic system of phonetic notation based primarily on the Latin script. It was devised by the International Phonetic Association in the late 19th century as a standardized representation of the sounds of spoken language.

== See also ==
- Philosophical language – Any constructed language that is constructed from first principles
- Celestial Emporium of Benevolent Knowledge – Fictional Chinese taxonomy system
