= Character (symbol) =

Character as a semiotic sign or symbol

A character is a semiotic sign, symbol, grapheme, or glyph – typically a letter, a numerical digit, an ideogram, a hieroglyph, a punctuation mark or another typographic mark.

== History ==
The Ancient Greek word χαρακτήρ (charaktēr) is an agent noun of the verb χαράσσω (charassō) with a meaning "to sharpen, to whet", and also "to engrave, to carve", from a Proto-Indo-European root *ǵʰer- "cut" also continued in Irish gearr and English gash, which is perhaps an early loan ultimately from the same Greek root.

A χαρακτήρ [characteer] is thus an "engraver", originally in the sense of a craftsman, but then also used for a tool used for engraving, and for a stamp for minting coins. From the stamp, the meaning was extended to the stamp impression, Plato using the noun in the sense of "engraved mark". In Plutarch, the word could refer to a figure or letter. Lucian uses it of hieroglyphs as opposed to Greek grammata.

Metaphorically, it could refer to a distinctive mark, Herodotus used it of a particular dialect, or of a characteristic mark of an individual. The collective noun χαρακτηριστικά "characteristics" appears later, in Dionysius Halicarnassensis.

Via Latin charactēr, Old French caracter, the word passed into Middle English as caracter in the 14th century. Wycliffe (1382) has "To haue a caracter [...] in her forhedis" for the mark of the beast (translating χάραγμα "imprinted or branded mark").

The word "character" was used in the sense of letter or grapheme by William Caxton, referring to the Phoenician alphabet: "The Fenyces were the fyrst inuentours of caracteris dyfferencing that one fro that other, of whiche were fourmed lettres for to write". As in Greek, the word was used especially for foreign or mysterious graphemes (such as Chinese, Syriac, or Runic ones) as opposed to the familiar letters; in particular of shorthand (in David Copperfield (chapter 38) sarcastically of shorthand, "a procession of new horrors, called arbitrary characters; the most despotic characters I have ever known"), and since 1949 in computing (see character (computing)).

As a collective noun, the word can refer to writing or printing in general (Shakespeare's sonnet nr. 59: "Since minde at first in carrecter was done", meaning "since thought was first put into writing").

== Graphemes, glyphs and hieroglyphs ==
A grapheme is a unifying identity for a number of different glyphs, called "allographs", that have the same meaning but have specific stylistic characteristics. For example, the letter "g" can be represented by either the serif glyph g or the sans-serif glyph g.

The word hieroglyph (Greek for sacred writing) dates from an early use in an English to Italian dictionary published by John Florio in 1598, referencing the complex and mysterious characters of the Egyptian alphabet. Egyptian hieroglyphs were the formal writing system used in Ancient Egypt. Hieroglyphs combined logographic, syllabic and alphabetic elements, with a total of some 1,000 distinct characters.

== Esotericism and magic ==
Dee's hieroglyph, whose meaning he explained in Monas Hieroglyphica as representing (from top to bottom): the moon; the sun; the elements; and fire.

The word in Renaissance magic came to refer to any astrological, kabbalistic or magical sign or symbol. John Dee (1527 – 1608), a mathematician and occultist, designed an esoteric symbol (right), which he described in his 1564 book, Monas Hieroglyphica: the word hieroglyph is a composite of hiero (holy) and glyph (a distinct character).

In the 19th century, this sense of the word appears mainly in Romantic poetry, such as Sir Walter Scott's The Lay of the Last Minstrel (1805), where "A hallow'd taper shed a glimmering light / On mystic implements of magic might; On cross, and character, and talisman," (6.17).

== Semiotics and epistemology ==
From the esoteric or mystical meanings, learned authors of the Early Modern period abstracted a notion of character as a code or hierarchical system that embodied all knowledge or all of reality, or a written representation of a philosophical language that would recover the "true names" lost in the confusion of tongues.

This idea had currency as a kind of epistemological philosophers' stone for about a century, from the mid 17th century, with Francis Lodwick (1642) and John Wilkins's Essay towards a Real Character, and a Philosophical Language (1668), to the later 18th century and the Encyclopédie where in a long entry under the heading Charactère, D'Alembert critically reviewed such projects of the past century.

== Computing ==
The same character in the linguistic sense, can be mapped to one or more computer characters depending on the character encoding. For example, the Unicode standard maps the same letters from Latin, Greek, and Hebrew alphabets to various duplicate code points in the Letterlike Symbols and other blocks, often meant to represent specific mathematical or scientific uses for that glyph. In some cases, duplicate compatibility characters are provided so that legacy character encodings can be straightforwardly transposed into Unicode, but these duplicate are deprecated.

== See also ==
- Typeface anatomy, the graphic elements that make up letters in a typeface
- Chinese characters
