= Cyprian Kinner =

German physician and linguist

Cyprian Kinner (died 1649) was a Silesian educator and linguist. He has been described as the bridge between the projects of 17th-century Europe concerned with a universal language, and those concerned with a philosophical language. He has also been called a pioneer of faceted classification.

== Life ==
Kinner was a pupil of Melchior Lauban in Brieg who also taught Samuel Hartlib and Abraham von Franckenberg, who both were to be important in Kinner's life; Lauban had previously been a professor of philology in Danzig, and was an admirer of Bartholomäus Keckermann. Kinner became physician in ordinary at the court of the Duchy of Brieg.

Kinner's career as physician and jurist was interrupted by the invasion of Silesia by troops of the Habsburg Empire. Around 1630 he was supported by the Dutch church in London. In 1631 he turned down an invitation from the Racovian Academy, instead going to the Imperial court in Prague at the request of Michael Sendivogius. In 1634 to 1635 he worked with Johann Heinrich Bisterfeld and Johann Heinrich Alsted.

From about 1644 to 1647, Kinner worked with Comenius, but the relationship was troubled. In the period 1645-6 the patronage of Louis de Geer, who said the salary was too high, looked uncertain; then Kinner was held up in Schleswig-Holstein. In the end he succeeded Georg Ritschel as assistant to Comenius, but suffered in the same way, being told that finances precluded keeping him on.

Kinner spent further time in Poland. There he knew the astronomer Maria Kunicka, and in Elbing in 1647 he associated with von Franckenburg and the Danzig astronomer Johan Hevelius. Right at the end of his life, in 1649, he visited England, where William Petty was set by Hartlib to translate one of his books into English. He died suddenly in May 1649.

== Works ==
Paolo Rossi considers that Kinner was the first to make a detailed formulation of the idea of a constructed language. Further, his motivations included mnemonics and botanical classification: and the relationship generally between scientific classifications and memory. He worked on botanical names alone as a pilot for a larger language project.

Kinner has been suggested as an influence on John Wilkins and An Essay towards a Real Character and a Philosophical Language. The connection depends on ideas unpublished at the time, though communicated to Hartlib in letters; Petty set to work on a botanical scheme, not long after hearing of Kinner's ideas via Hartlib. Kinner had the idea of composite signs, rather than letter combinations.

The Summary Delineation, translated for Hartlib from Kinner's Diatyposis, was a lacklustre piece of Comenian educational theory. Kinner found a role in school education for animals, and has been called also a follower of Eilhardus Lubinus.
