= An Essay Towards a Real Character, and a Philosophical Language =

Book by John Wilkins

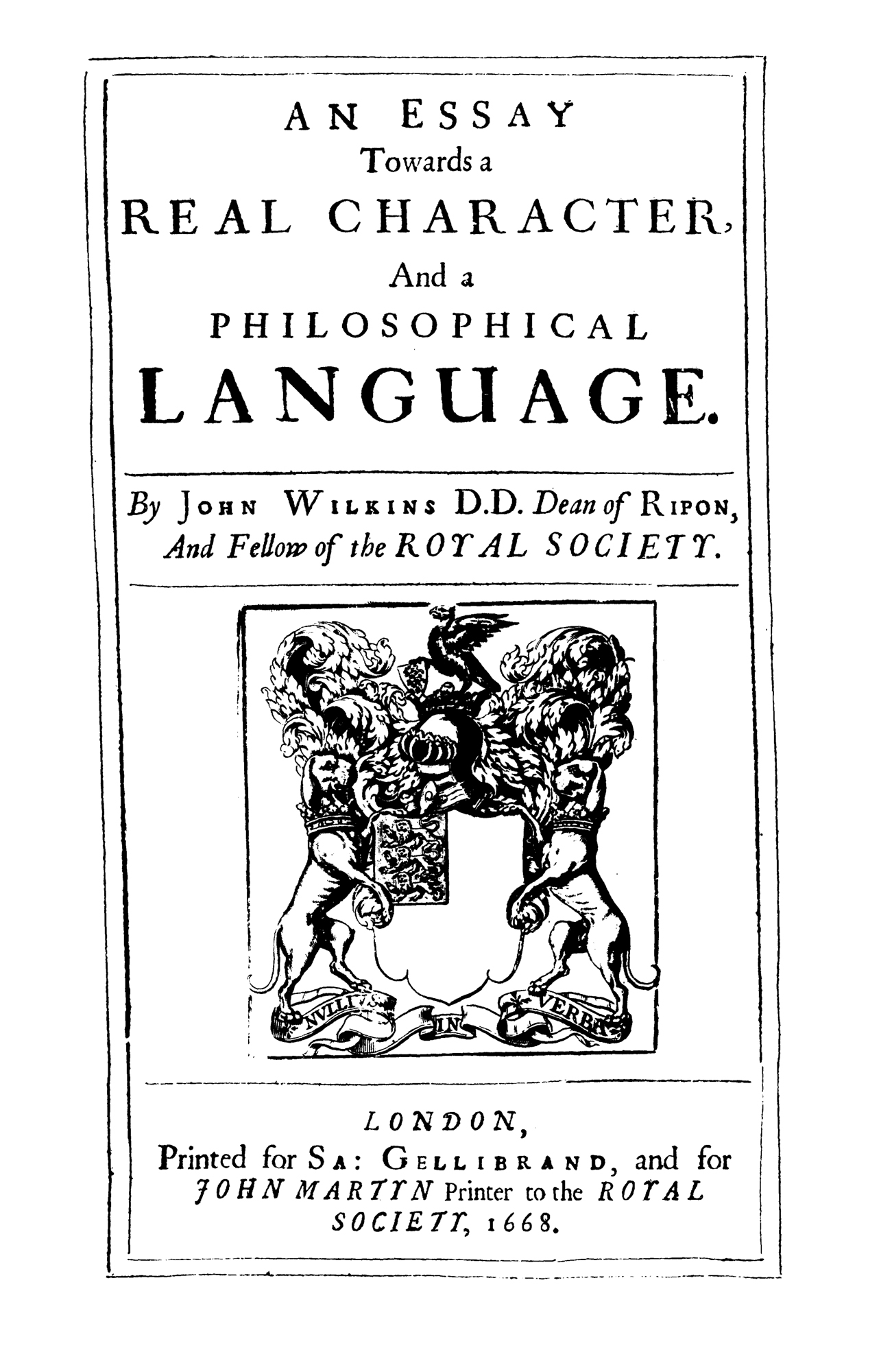
- Title page of the first edition
- Author: John Wilkins
- Language: English
- Publisher: Printed for Sa[muel] Gellibrand, and for John Martyn printer to the Royal Society
- Publication date: 1668
- Publication place: London, England
- Media type: Hardcover
- Pages: 454
- OCLC: 4088592

An Essay Towards a Real Character, and a Philosophical Language (London, 1668) is the best-remembered of the numerous works of the English natural philosopher John Wilkins, in which he expounds a new universal language, meant primarily to facilitate international communication among scholars, but envisioned for use by diplomats, travelers, and merchants as well. Unlike many universal language schemes of the period, it was meant merely as an auxiliary to—not a replacement of—existing natural languages.

== Background ==
One of the aims of the Essay was to provide a replacement for the Latin language, which had been the international language of scholars in Western Europe by then for 1000 years. Comenius and others interested in international languages had criticisms of the arbitrary features of Latin that made it harder to learn, and Wilkins also made such points. A scheme for a lingua franca based on numerical values had been published by John Pell (1630); and in his 1640 work Mercury or the Secret Messenger (1640) Wilkins had mentioned the possibility of developing a trade language.

Seth Ward was author with Wilkins of Vindiciae academiarum (1654), a defence of the Commonwealth period of the Oxbridge university system against outsider reformers. In it Ward put forward a related language scheme, though differing from the Essay of Wilkins in some significant ways. Ward's ideas derived from a number of sources, such as Cyprian Kinner who was a follower of Comenius, Ramon Lull, and Georg Ritschel. They went on to influence George Dalgarno as well as Wilkins.

There was immediate interest in the Essay; Wilkins is said to have regarded his work only in terms of a proof of concept. But in the medium term enthusiasm for this kind of constructed language declined. The problem of a universal language remained as a topic of debate.

== Composition and influences ==
The stimulus for Wilkins to write the Essay came from the Council of the Royal Society, in 1662. The work was delayed by the Great Fire of London of 1666, which destroyed some of it in draft.

The book was written by Wilkins, assisted by John Ray, Francis Willughby, and others. An influence was the Ars Signorum of George Dalgarno. Also influential, as Wilkins acknowledged, was The Ground-Work or Foundation Laid ... for the Framing of a New Perfect Language (1652) by Francis Lodwick.

== Structure ==
The work is in five parts, of which the fourth contains the discussion of the "real character" and "philosophical language". The third deals with "philosophical grammar" (universal grammar). The last part is the "alphabetical dictionary". It was compiled by William Lloyd.

== Wilkins's scheme ==
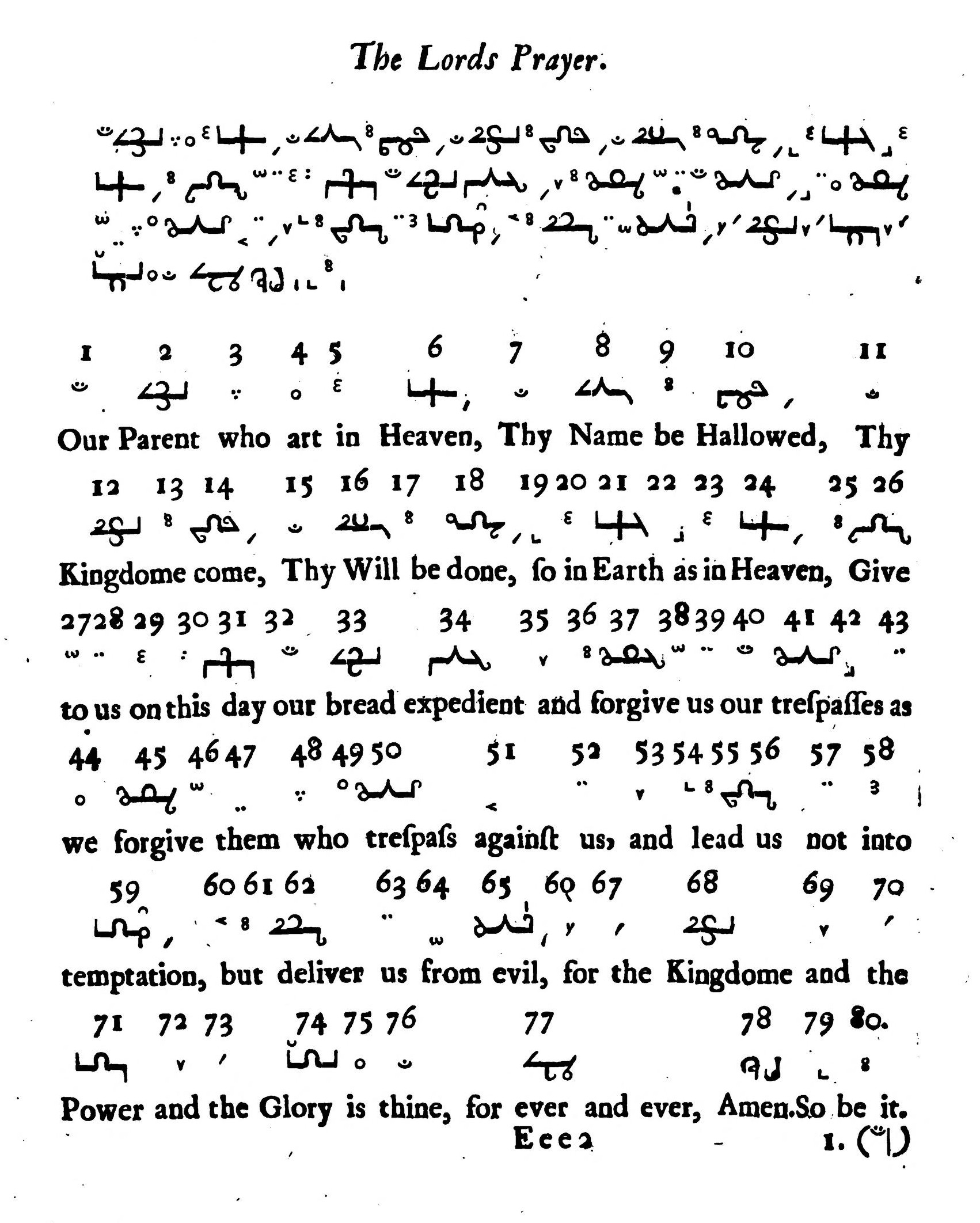
Sample of the "real character" from the Essay. Joseph Moxon created the symbols for the printing of the book.

Wilkins's "Real Character" is a constructed family of symbols, corresponding to a classification scheme developed by Wilkins and his colleagues. It was intended as a pasigraphy, in other words, to provide elementary building blocks from which could be constructed the universe's every possible thing and notion. The Real Character is not an orthography: i.e. it is not a written representation of spoken language. Instead, each symbol represents a concept directly, without (at least in the early parts of the Essay's presentation) there being any way of vocalizing it. Inspiration for this approach came in part from contemporary European accounts of the Chinese writing system, which were somewhat mistaken.

Later in the Essay Wilkins introduces his "Philosophical Language", which assigns phonetic values to the Real Characters. For convenience, the following discussion blurs the distinction between Wilkins's Character and his Language.

Concepts are divided into forty main Genera, each of which gives the first two-letter syllable of the word; a Genus is divided into Differences, each of which adds another letter; and Differences are divided into Species, which add a fourth letter. For instance, Zi identifies the Genus of "beasts" (mammals); Zit gives the Difference of "rapacious beasts of the dog kind"; Zitα gives the Species of dogs. (Sometimes the first letter indicates a supercategory—e.g. Z always indicates an animal—but this does not always hold.) The resulting Character, and its vocalization, for a given concept thus captures, to some extent, the concept's semantics.

The Essay also proposed ideas on weights and measure similar to those later found in the metric system.

The botanical section of the essay was contributed by John Ray; Robert Morison's criticism of Ray's work began a prolonged dispute between the two men.

== Related efforts, discussions, and literary references ==
The Essay has received a certain amount of academic and literary attention, usually casting it as brilliant but hopeless. It has been described as a "utopian" text.

One criticism (among many) is that "words expressing closely related ideas have almost the same form, differing perhaps by their last letter only...[I]t would be exceedingly difficult to remember all these minute distinctions, and confusion would arise, in rapid reading and particularly in conversation." (Umberto Eco notes that Wilkins himself made such a mistake in the Essay, using Gαde (barley) where apparently Gαpe (tulip) was meant.) However, others claim that natural languages already have such minute differences, and that to assume that such differences would be indistinguishable would be to claim that natural languages fail at this.

George Edmonds sought to improve Wilkins's Philosophical Language by reorganizing its grammar and orthography while keeping its taxonomy. More recent a priori languages (among many others) are Solresol and Ro.

Jorge Luis Borges discusses Wilkins's philosophical language in his essay El idioma analítico de John Wilkins (The Analytical Language of John Wilkins), comparing Wilkins's classification to the fictitious Chinese encyclopedia Celestial Emporium of Benevolent Knowledge and expressing doubts about any attempt at a universal classification.

In Neal Stephenson's Quicksilver, character Daniel Waterhouse spends considerable time supporting the development of Wilkins's classification system.

== See also ==
- Oligosynthetic language – Type of language morphology
- Philosophical language – Any constructed language that is constructed from first principles
- Characteristica universalis – Leibnizian universal language concept
- Semantic primitives – Linguistic theory of semantic description
- Menace from the Moon (1925 novel) – 1925 novel by Bohun Lynch
- The Analytical Language of John Wilkins – Essay by Borges, a critique of this work by Jorge Luis Borges
- La Ricerca della Lingua Perfetta nella Cultura Europea – Linguistics book by Umberto Eco (The Search for a Perfect Language) by Umberto Eco, about Wilkins, Leibniz, Ramon Lull's and other's attempts to devise an ideal language
