= Thomas Pigot =

English academic

Thomas Pigot (Pigott, Piggott) (1657–1686) was an English cleric, academic and Fellow of the Royal Society. He is known for work in acoustics, and as a committee member for the Society's universal language project.

== Life ==
He was born in Brindle, Lancashire. He graduated B.A. (1676) at Wadham College, Oxford, becoming Fellow there in 1677, and graduating M.A. in 1678. He was presented to the living of Yarnton in 1681, and was appointed chaplain by James Butler, Earl of Ossory. He died in Ossory's house.

== Works ==
Pigot as an undergraduate did research work on acoustics: it revealed the way in which the vibrating string could have stationary nodes. The discoveries (1674) may have been jointly made, with William Noble of Merton College, and the project is thought by some to have been supervised by John Wallis; in any case Wallis wrote up the results for publication (1677). It followed on from earlier work of Francis North, written up in his essay also published in 1677. The nodal points and the related discoveries on sympathetic resonance and the harmonic series were incorporated in the textbook by Wallis, De algebra, in 1693. The resulting theory did not, however, amount to an account of overtones in the modern sense: the connection between vibration in "aliquot parts", and the higher harmonics, was not clarified in this period. Research was taken further by Joseph Sauveur.

Pigot was admitted a Fellow of the Royal Society in 1679, and took part in the committee discussions on linguistics. He may have been involved in these debates already by 1678, on John Aubrey's account. John Wilkins, an influential figure in the Society's founding, had died in 1672, and the project of his An Essay towards a Real Character and a Philosophical Language (1668) was a legacy taken up by Fellows. Debate had started in earnest in 1676, over whether the taxonomic scheme of Wilkins for a universal language could be implemented effectively; committee members included Aubrey, Robert Hooke, Francis Lodwick, John Ray, and Andrew Paschall. Pigot was one of those who remained sceptical about progress on a universal language. But he took part in testing its potential, for example when he joined Paschall and Richard Towneley in making translations of the design by Hooke of a watch mechanism, back from Hooke's "real character" version.

Pigot reported an Oxford earthquake of 1683 in the Philosophical Transactions.
