= The Analytical Language of John Wilkins =

Essay by Borges

- First edition of Otras Inquisiciones (1937–1952), published by Sur (Buenos Aires) in 1952
- Author: Jorge Luis Borges
- Original title: El idioma analitico de John Wilkins
- Genre: Criticism, linguistics
- Published in: La Nación
- Publication date: 1942
- OCLC: 6362491

"The Analytical Language of John Wilkins" (Spanish: "El idioma analítico de John Wilkins") is a short essay by Argentine writer Jorge Luis Borges, first printed in La Nación on 8 February 1942 and subsequently published in Otras Inquisiciones (1937–1952). It is a critique of the English natural philosopher and writer John Wilkins's proposal for a universal language and of the representational capacity of language generally. In it, Borges imagines a bizarre and whimsical fictional Chinese taxonomy later quoted by Michel Foucault, David Byrne, and others.

== Summary ==
Borges begins by noting John Wilkins's absence from the 14th edition of the Encyclopædia Britannica and makes the case for Wilkins's significance, highlighting in particular the universal language scheme detailed in his An Essay towards a Real Character and a Philosophical Language (1668). Wilkins's system decomposes the entire universe of "things and notions" into successively smaller divisions and subdivisions, assigning at each step of this decomposition a syllable, consonant, or vowel. Wilkins intended for these conceptual building blocks to be recombined to represent anything on earth or in heaven. The basic example Borges gives is "de, which means an element; deb, the first of the elements, fire; deba, a part of the element of fire, a flame."

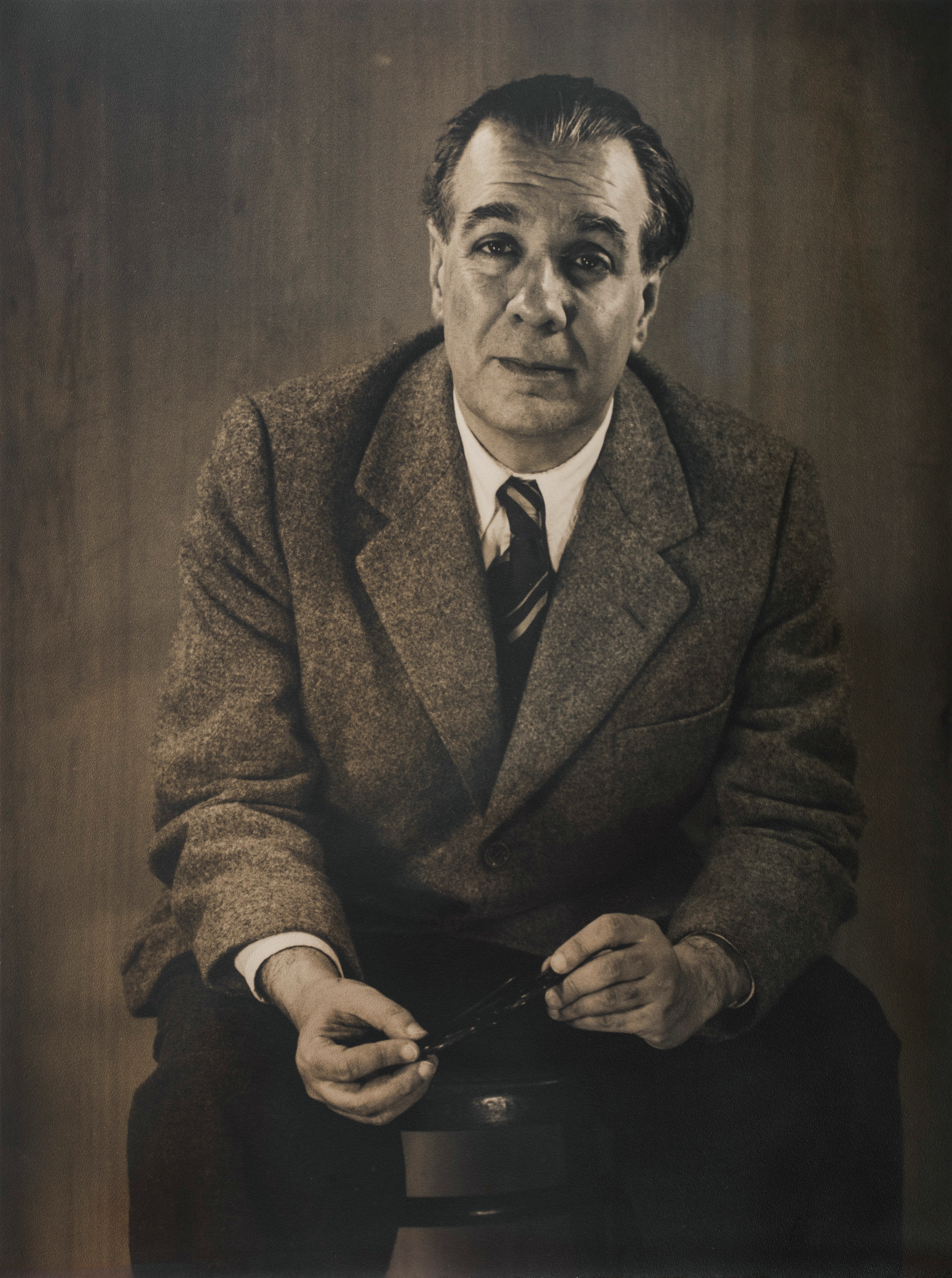
Borges in 1951 (photo by Grete Stern)

Examining this and other second-hand examples from Wilkins's scheme‍—‌he did not have access to Wilkins's actual work, but based his comments on others' comments on it‍—‌Borges believes he finds "ambiguities, redundancies and deficiencies", concluding "it is clear that there is no classification of the Universe not being arbitrary and full of conjectures." He fancifully likens Wilkins's classification scheme to a "certain Chinese encyclopedia," one of his own fabrication but attributed to translator Franz Kuhn, called the Celestial Emporium of Benevolent Knowledge, said to divide animals into "(a) those that belong to the Emperor, (b) embalmed ones, (c) those that are trained, (d) suckling pigs, (e) mermaids, (f) fabulous ones, (g) stray dogs, (h) those that are included in the present classification, (i) those that tremble as if they are mad, (j) innumerable ones, (k) those drawn with a very fine camelhair brush, (l) others, (m) those that have just broken a flower vase, (n) those that look like flies from a long way off." Borges's point is the arbitrary nature of such taxonomies, regardless of whether they form a language or just a way of understanding and ordering the world. He challenges the idea of the universe as something we can understand at all‍—‌"we do not know what thing the universe is"‍—‌much less describe using language.

While considering Wilkins's effort naïve, Borges ultimately praises the ambition of a universal language and admits that Wilkins's word for salmon, zana, could (for someone well-versed in Wilkins's language) hold more meaning than the corresponding words in conventional languages, which are arbitrary and carry no intrinsic meaning. He says that, "Theoretically, it is not impossible to think of a language where the name of each thing says all the details of its destiny, past and future."

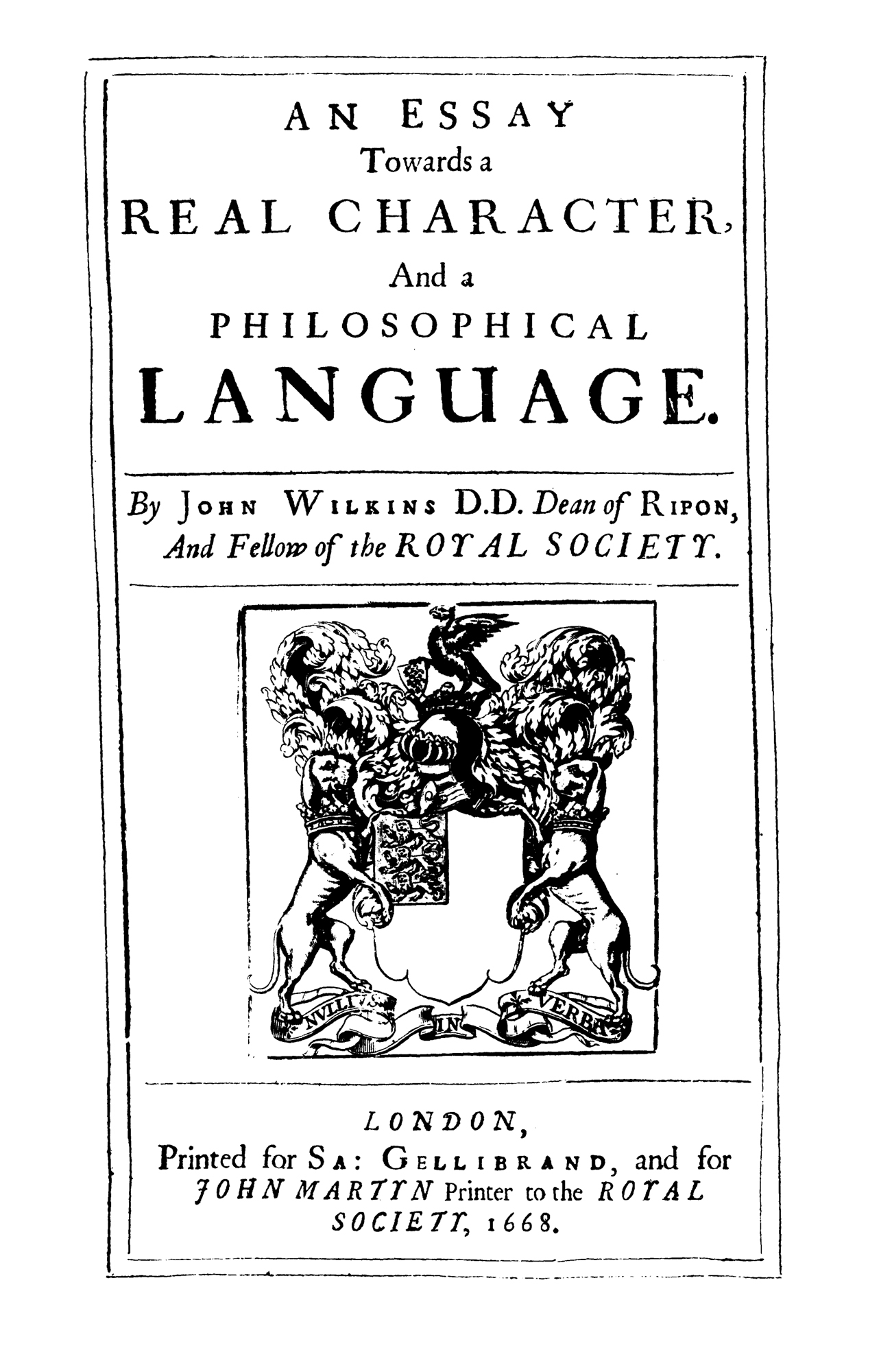
Frontispiece of John Wilkins's An Essay Towards a Real Character, And a Philosophical Language (1668)

== Commentary and uses by others ==
Michel Foucault attributes the inspiration for his The Order of Things to Borges' "Celestial Emporium" passage and "the laughter that shattered, as I read the passage, all the familiar landmarks of my thought ... breaking up all the ordered surfaces and all the planes with which we are accustomed to tame the wild profusion of existing things ...." Foucault is disturbed less by the Emporium's arbitrariness than by the idea that such a classification might be intelligible to someone or some culture, then discusses the ways cultures make sense of the world by drawing relationships between things, expressed through language. What Borges did, according to Foucault, was to highlight the importance of the "site" of order by taking it away, asking in what context the Celestial Emporium might make sense.

The Emporium has often been used as a shorthand for the subversion of traditional, rational notions of order. The artist and musician David Byrne has created an art work, "The Evolution of Category", that shows a hierarchical tree responding both to Borges' hierarchy and to Claude Lévi-Strauss's human categories.

== See also ==
- Artificial language
- Characteristica universalis
- Episteme
- George Dalgarno
- Ontology (computer science)
- René Descartes, whom Borges mentions as someone else who had worked on a universal language.
- International Federation for Information and Documentation, mentioned by Borges in the novel as the "Institute of Bibliography" in Brussels
