= Celestial Emporium of Benevolent Knowledge =

Fictional Chinese taxonomy system

Celestial Emporium of Benevolent Knowledge (Spanish: Emporio celestial de conocimientos benévolos) is a fictitious taxonomy of animals described by the writer Jorge Luis Borges in his 1942 essay "The Analytical Language of John Wilkins" (El idioma analítico de John Wilkins).

== Overview ==
Wilkins, a 17th-century philosopher, had proposed a universal language based on a classification system that would encode a description of the thing a word describes into the word itself—for example, Zi identifies the genus beasts; Zit denotes the "difference" rapacious beasts of the dog kind; and finally Zitα specifies dog.

In response to this proposal and in order to illustrate the arbitrariness and cultural specificity of any attempt to categorize the world, Borges describes this example of an alternate taxonomy, supposedly taken from an ancient Chinese encyclopaedia entitled Celestial Emporium of Benevolent Knowledge. The list divides all animals into 14 categories.

Borges's Spanish	English translation
pertenecientes al Emperador	those belonging to the Emperor
embalsamados	embalmed ones
amaestrados	trained ones
lechones	suckling pigs
sirenas	mermaids (or sirens)
fabulosos	fabled ones
perros sueltos	stray dogs
incluidos en esta clasificación	those included in this classification (see Russell's paradox)
que se agitan como locos	those that tremble as if they were mad (insane)
innumerables	innumerable ones
dibujados con un pincel finísimo de pelo de camello	those drawn with a very fine camel hair brush
etcétera	et cetera
que acaban de romper el jarrón	those that have just broken the vase
que de lejos parecen moscas	those that from afar look like flies

Borges claims that the list was discovered in its Chinese source by the translator Franz Kuhn.

In his essay, Borges compares this classification with one allegedly used at the time by the Institute of Bibliography in Brussels, which he considers similarly chaotic. Borges says the Institute divides the universe in 1000 sections, of which number 262 is about the Pope, ironically classified apart from section 264, that on the Roman Catholic Church. Meanwhile, section 294 encompasses all four of Hinduism, Shinto, Buddhism and Taoism. He also finds excessive heterogeneity in section 179, which includes animal cruelty, suicide, mourning, and an assorted group of vices and virtues.

Borges concludes: "there is no description of the universe that isn't arbitrary and conjectural for a simple reason: we don't know what the universe is". Nevertheless, he finds Wilkins' language to be clever (ingenioso) in its design, as arbitrary as it may be. He points out that in a language with a divine scheme of the universe, beyond human capabilities, the name of an object would include the details of its entire past and future.

== Influences of the list ==
This list has stirred considerable philosophical and literary commentary.

Michel Foucault begins his preface to The Order of Things,

This book first arose out of a passage in Borges, out of the laughter that shattered, as I read the passage, all the familiar landmarks of thought—our thought, the thought that bears the stamp of our age and our geography—breaking up all the ordered surfaces and all the planes with which we are accustomed to tame the wild profusion of existing things and continuing long afterwards to disturb and threaten with collapse our age-old definitions between the Same and the Other.

Foucault then quotes Borges' passage.

Louis Sass has suggested, in response to Borges' list, that such "Chinese" thinking shows signs of typical schizophrenic thought processes. By contrast, the linguist George Lakoff has pointed out that while Borges' list is not possibly a human categorization, many categorizations of objects found in nonwestern cultures have a similar feeling to Westerners.

Keith Windschuttle, an Australian historian, cited alleged acceptance of the authenticity of the list by many academics as a sign of the degeneration of the Western academy and a terminal lack of humor.

== See also ==
- An Essay towards a Real Character and a Philosophical Language, the 1668 work of John Wilkins that was the subject of Borges' essay
- Book of Imaginary Beings, Borges' bestiary, a catalog of fantastic animals
- Emic and etic (a corollary of Borges' point is that although etic classifications are less arbitrary than emic ones, all human efforts at etic classification are bound by the limits of human understanding and thus are imperfectly etic)
- Entish, a theoretical imaginary language in J. R. R. Tolkien's The Lord of the Rings, where tree creatures name objects by relating what they know of their entire past, similarly to Borges' divine language in this essay
- Leishu – a genre of reference books historically compiled in China and other countries of the Sinosphere
- Philosophical language – Any constructed language that is constructed from first principles
- Characteristica universalis – Leibnizian universal language concept
