= Babel text =

Biblical text used for language comparison

Logo of the Language Creation Society - The flag includes the Tower of Babel because of the tradition of translating this text.

The Babel text is a short text from the Old Testament that is often used for language comparison.

== The Tower of Babel ==
The story of the Tower of Babel from Genesis 11: 1-9 is an explanation for why there are so many different languages.

The Tower of Babel by Pieter Bruegel the Elder (1563)

Due to its repetitive nature, the Babel text is used for language comparisons and to illustrate the grammatical structure of a particular language. Over time, it became a tradition for conlang developers to translate the Babel text into their own language and publish it.

This makes it easier to compare constructed languages with each other and with other natural languages. The idea for the Babel text was proposed in 1996 by conlanger Jeffrey Henning. Henning recommended this text as a standard comparison, pointing to its repetitive patterns, numerous existing translations, and less rigid form than the widely used Lord's Prayer.

== Natural languages ==
=== Latin ===
Erat autem terra labii unius, et sermonum eorumdem.

=== Spanish ===
(La Biblia de las Américas, 1986)

Toda la tierra hablaba la misma lengua y las mismas palabras.

=== Portuguese ===
E era toda a terra de uma mesma língua e de uma mesma fala.

=== French ===
(Louis Segond)

Toute la terre avait une seule langue et les mêmes mots.

=== English ===
(King James Version)

And the whole earth was of one language, and of one speech.

== Planned languages ==
=== aUI ===
Ib can-Yzm Eca pAc Ub a*mØm nUI Ib Ub a* UIvØ.

=== Esperanto ===
Sur la tuta tero estis unu lingvo kaj unu parolmaniero.

=== Ido ===
Now the whole world had one language and one common manner of speech.

=== Klingon ===
“ej wa” Hol je QIch rap ghaj qo' Dol.

=== Lojban ===
.i piro le munje cu se bangu pada gi'e selkau le ka tavla fo makau

=== Quenya ===
Ar i quanda cemen sámë er lambë ar imyë quettar.

=== Toki Pona ===
ma ale li jo e toki wan e toki sama.

=== Volapük ===
E tal lölik ädalabon püki bal e spikamamodi bal.

== Other comparative texts ==
The Lord's Prayer in five hundred languages, 1905

=== The Lord's Prayer ===
Since the 16th century, the Lord's Prayer has been widely translated and collected to compare languages across regions and history. It shares thematic and linguistic parallels with prayers and texts from various religious traditions—including the Hebrew Bible and is particularly suitable for language comparison because it contains passages with specific grammatical forms: subjunctive, (negative) imperative, relative clause, adverbial clause.

==== English ====
Our Father, who art in heaven,
hallowed be thy name,
thy kingdom come,
thy will be done,
on earth as it is in heaven.

==== French ====
Notre Père, qui est aux cieux,
que ton nom soit sanctifié,
que ton règne vienne,
que ta volonté soit faite sur la terre comme au ciel.

==== Esperanto ====
Patro nia, kiu estas en la cxielo,
sanktigita estu via nomo,
venu via regno,
plenumigxu via volo,
kiel en la cxielo, tiel ankaux sur la tero.

=== Article 1 of the Universal Declaration of Human Rights ===
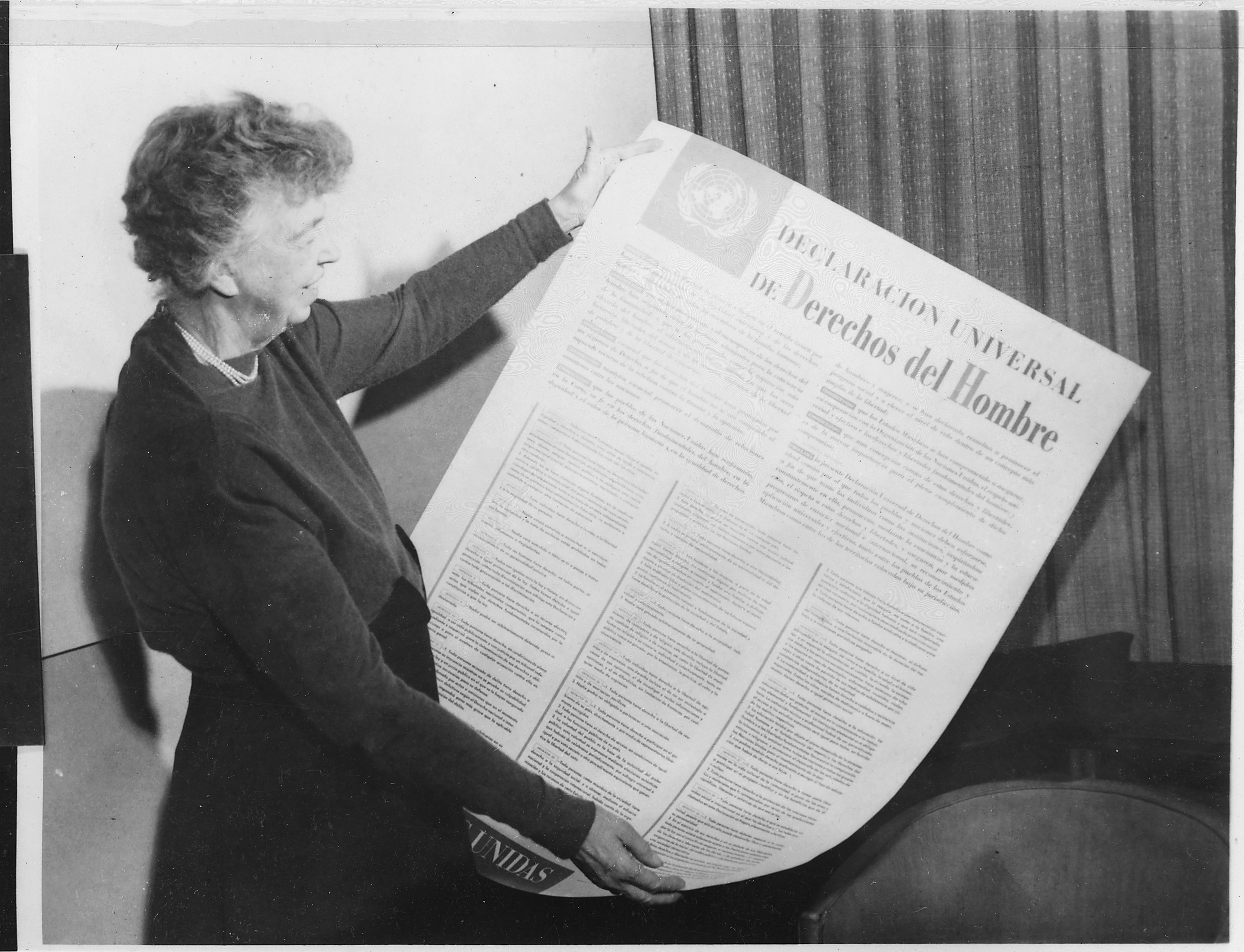
Eleanor Roosevelt and United Nations Universal Declaration of Human Rights in Spanish, 1949

A comparison of the different translations can provide insights into cultural differences and nuances in the interpretation of human rights.

==== English ====
All human beings are born free and equal in dignity and rights. They are endowed with reason and conscience and should act towards one another in a spirit of brotherhood.

==== Spanish ====
Todos los seres humanos nacen libres e iguales en dignidad y derechos y, dotados como están de razón y conciencia, deben comportarse fraternalmente los unos con los otros.

==== Esperanto ====
Ĉiuj homoj estas denaske liberaj kaj egalaj laŭ digno kaj rajtoj. Ili posedas racion kaj konsciencon, kaj devus konduti unu al alia en spirito de frateco.

=== The North Wind and the Sun ===
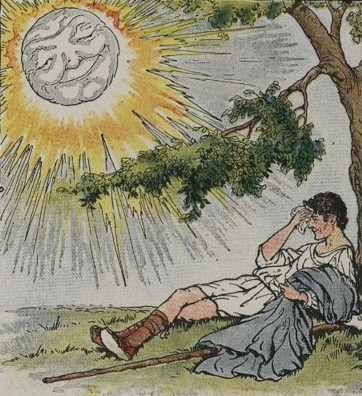
The Sun and the Wind

This fable by Aesop is well suited for a parallel translation as a short text that can be rendered much more freely.

==== English ====
The North Wind and the Sun disputed as to which was the most powerful, and agreed that he should be declared the victor who could first strip a wayfaring man of his clothes.

==== French ====
Le vent du nord et le soleil se disputaient pour savoir lequel des deux était le plus fort, lorsqu'un voyageur arriva enveloppé d'un manteau chaud.

==== Esperanto ====
La Vento kaj la Suno disputis pri kiu estas la plej forta. “Mi elradikigis gigantajn arbojn kaj dronigis milionojn da ŝipoj. Vi povas fari nek unu nek la alian,” fiere diris la Vento.
