= Lingua generalis =

Essay by Gottfried Leibniz

Lingua generalis was an essay written by Gottfried Leibniz in February, 1678 in which he presented a philosophical language he created, which he named lingua generalis or lingua universalis.

Leibniz aimed for his lingua universalis to be adopted as a universal language and be used for calculations. As a result of this work, he developed binary calculus.

== See also ==
- Constructed language
