= La Ricerca della Lingua Perfetta nella Cultura Europea =

Linguistics book by Umberto Eco

First edition

La ricerca della lingua perfetta nella cultura europea (The Search for the Perfect Language (the Making of Europe); trans. James Fentress) is a 1993 book by Umberto Eco about attempts to devise an ideal language. The writing is essayistic and uses the biblical story of Babel as a paradigm for connecting linguistic and social practices. Emphasizing that the quest for a perfect language has never been devoid of ideological motivation, Eco outlines some objections to the idea and suggests that an International Auxiliary Language, such as Esperanto, is a more realistic project. He points out that the impossible quest has had some useful side effects (taxonomy, scientific notations etc.) but dwells mostly on exotic proposals. Lengthy passages are devoted to Dante, Lull, Kircher, various 17th-century authors and a few less well-known names from later times. The contemporary project for a politically and culturally unified Europe provides the perspective for a more serious consideration of the theme.

== Contents ==
1. From Adam to Confusio Linguarum
2. The Kabbalistic pansemioticism
3. The perfect language of Dante
4. The Ars Magna of Raymond Lull
5. The Monogenetic Hypothesis and the Mother Tongues
6. Kabbalism and Lullism in Modern Culture
7. The Perfect language of Images
8. Magic language
9. Polygraphies
10. 'A priori' philosophical languages
11. George Dalgarno
12. John Wilkins
13. Francis Lodwick
14. From Leibniz to the Encyclopédie
15. Philosophical Language from the Enlightenment to Today
16. The International Auxiliary Languages
17. Conclusion

== English editions ==
- Blackwell Publishing Limited (1995) ISBN 0-631-17465-6.
- Fontana Press (1997), ISBN 0-00-686378-7.
