= Thomas Pigott =

Thomas Pigott or Pigot may refer to:

- Thomas Pigott (Bedfordshire MP) (c.1526–1579), MP for Bedfordshire in 1559
- Thomas Pigott (Aylesbury MP), MP for Aylesbury in 1589
- Thomas Pigott (Queen's County MP) (c.1615–1674), Anglo-Irish soldier, lawyer, and MP for Queen's County
- Thomas Pigot (1657–1686), English priest, linguist, and scientist
- Thomas Pigott (British Army officer) (1734–1793), Anglo-Irish general, military engineer and MP for Taghmon and Midleton
- Tommy Pigott, American government official, spokesperson for the United States Department of State
