= Franz Kuhn =

Franz Walther Kuhn (10 March 1884 – 22 January 1961) was a German lawyer and translator chiefly remembered for translating many Chinese novels into German, most famously the Dream of the Red Chamber.

== Biography ==
Kuhn studied law at the University of Leipzig and the University of Berlin, passing his state examination in 1908 and obtaining his doctorate in 1909. He began to practice law in Dresden in 1909. He was soon assigned to the German delegation to Peking as an interpreter, having completed a course of Chinese during his study at Berlin. He stayed in China until 1912.

After the First World War, Kuhn began to translate classic Chinese literature into German. Eventually he ran into conflict with the Nazi authorities, who considered his works to be harmful. After the end of World War II, Kuhn's work began to be more widely known and appreciated. He received the Order of Merit of the Federal Republic of Germany in 1952.

Jorge Luis Borges attributes the discovery of a "paradoxical list of animals" to Kuhn. The list has become the subject of much modern commentary after it was cited by Foucault. However, Borges's attribution is the only known evidence that either such a work existed or that Kuhn discussed it (it is, actually, a fictional attribution; see Otras Inquisiciones (in Spanish)).

== Translations ==
- Chinesische Staatsweisheit, Darmstadt 1923
- Chinesische Meisternovellen, Leipzig 1926
- Eisherz und Edeljaspis oder Die Geschichte einer glücklichen Gattenwahl, Leipzig 1926
- Die Rache des jungen Meh oder Das Wunder der zweiten Pflaumenblüte, Leipzig 1927
- Das Perlenhemd, Leipzig 1928
- Kin Ping Meh oder Die abenteuerliche Geschichte von Hsi Men und seinen sechs Frauen, Leipzig 1930
- Fräulein Tschang, Berlin [u.a.] 1931
- Der Traum der roten Kammer, Leipzig 1932
- Die Räuber vom Liang-Schan-Moor, Leipzig 1934
- Die Jadelibelle, Berlin 1936
- Das Juwelenkästchen, Dresden 1937
- Mao Dun: Schanghai im Zwielicht, Dresden 1938
- Die dreizehnstöckige Pagode, Berlin 1939
- Mondfrau und Silbervase, Berlin 1939
- Die drei Reiche, Berlin 1940
- Das Rosenaquarell, Zürich 1947
- Das Tor der östlichen Blüte, Düsseldorf 1949
- Und Buddha lacht, Baden-Baden 1950
- Der Turm der fegenden Wolken, Freiburg i. Br. 1951
- Kin Ku Ki Kwan, Zürich 1952
- Goldamsel flötet am Westsee, Freiburg i. Br. 1953
- Wen Kang: Die schwarze Reiterin, Zürich 1954
- Blumenschatten hinter dem Vorhang, Freiburg i. Br. 1956
- Altchinesische Liebesgeschichten, Wiesbaden 1958
- Die schöne Li. Vom Totenhemd ins Brautkleid, Wiesbaden 1959
- Li Yü: Jou pu tuan, Zürich 1959
- Goldjunker Sung und andere Novellen aus dem Kin Ku Ki Kwan, Zürich 1960

== See also ==
- List of translators
