= Velké Chvojno =

- Municipality
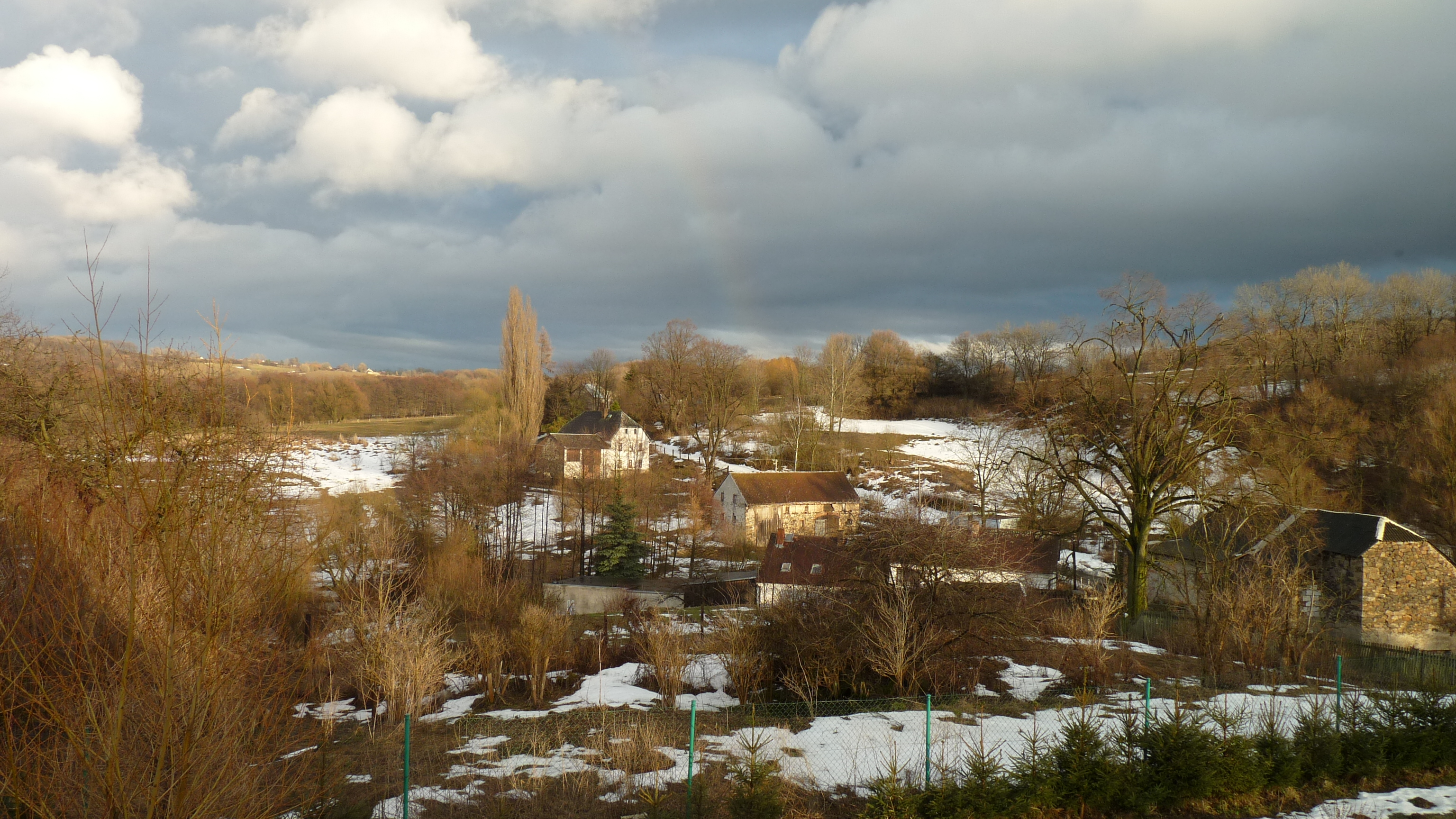
- Žďár, a part of Velké Chvojno

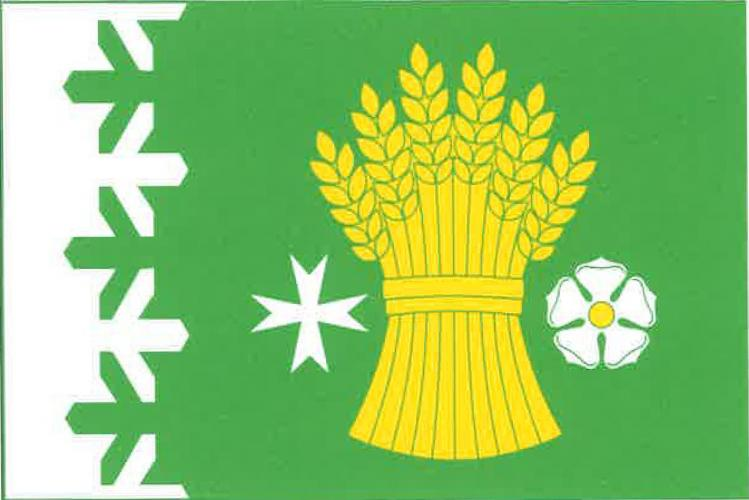
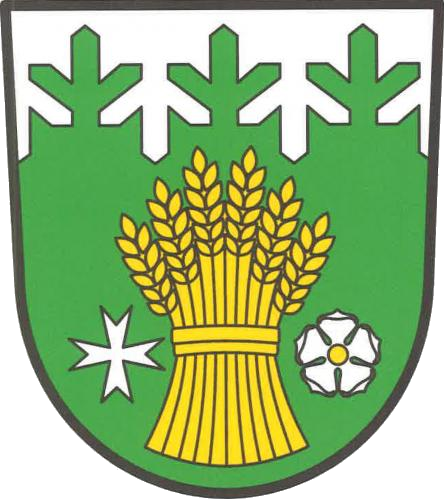
- Flag Coat of arms

- Location in the Czech Republic
- Coordinates: 50°43′54″N 14°2′13″E
- Country: Czech Republic
- Region: Ústí nad Labem
- District: Ústí nad Labem
- First mentioned: 1352

Area
  - Total: 17.13 km^{2} (6.61 sq mi)
- Elevation: 411 m (1,348 ft)

Population (2026-01-01)
  - Total: 872
  - Density: 50.9/km^{2} (132/sq mi)
- Time zone: UTC+1 (CET)
  - Summer (DST): UTC+2 (CEST)
- Postal codes: 400 02, 403 34
- Website: www.obecvelkechvojno.cz

Velké Chvojno (until 1948 České Chvojno; German: Böhmisch Kahn) is a municipality and village in Ústí nad Labem District in the Ústí nad Labem Region of the Czech Republic. It has about 900 inhabitants.

== Administrative division ==
Velké Chvojno consists of six municipal parts (in brackets population according to the 2021 census):

- Velké Chvojno (341)
- Arnultovice (69)
- Luční Chvojno (144)
- Malé Chvojno (110)
- Mnichov (51)
- Žďár (86)

== Etymology ==
The name Chvojno was transferred from the hill Chvojen (today called Chvojenec) to the three villages at the foot of the hill. The name of the hill was documented already in 1169. Velké Chvojno ('great Chvojno') was historically known as České Chvojno ('Czech Chvojno'), while Luční Chvojno ('meadow Chvojno') was known as Německé Chvojno ('German Chvojno'). The third village is Malé Chvojno ('small Chvojno').

== Geography ==
Velké Chvojno is located about 5 kilometres (3 mi) north of Ústí nad Labem. It lies mostly in the Central Bohemian Uplands and in the České středohoří Protected Landscape Area. The western part of the municipal territory extends into the Most Basin. The highest point is a hill at 529 m (1,736 ft) above sea level.

== History ==
The first written mention of České Chvojno is from 1352, when it was part of the Krupka estate. It was probably founded in the 13th century. However, the oldest part of today's municipality is the village of Žďár, which was first mentioned in 1227.

In 1948, the municipality was renamed from České Chvojno to its current name.

== Demographics ==
Historical population

Year	Pop.	±%
1869	1,379	—
1880	1,258	−8.8%
1890	1,234	−1.9%
1900	1,169	−5.3%
1910	1,156	−1.1%

Year	Pop.	±%
1921	1,148	−0.7%
1930	1,234	+7.5%
1950	809	−34.4%
1961	627	−22.5%
1970	669	+6.7%

Year	Pop.	±%
1980	660	−1.3%
1991	558	−15.5%
2001	662	+18.6%
2011	738	+11.5%
2021	801	+8.5%

Source: Censuses

== Transport ==
The I/13 road (the section from Teplice to Děčín) runs along the western municipal border.

During the tourist season, on weekends and holidays, a train on the Děčín–Telnice line runs through Malé Chvojno. The ČSD Class M 152.0 retro train drives there.

== Sights ==
The most notable building of the municipality is the Church of All Saints in Arnultovice. It was originally a late Gothic church, first mentioned in 1352. It 1798, the church was rebuilt in the Baroque style and was enlarged.

== Notable people ==
- Georg Ritschel (1616–1683), Protestant minister and educator
