= George Edmonds (lawyer) =

British lawyer

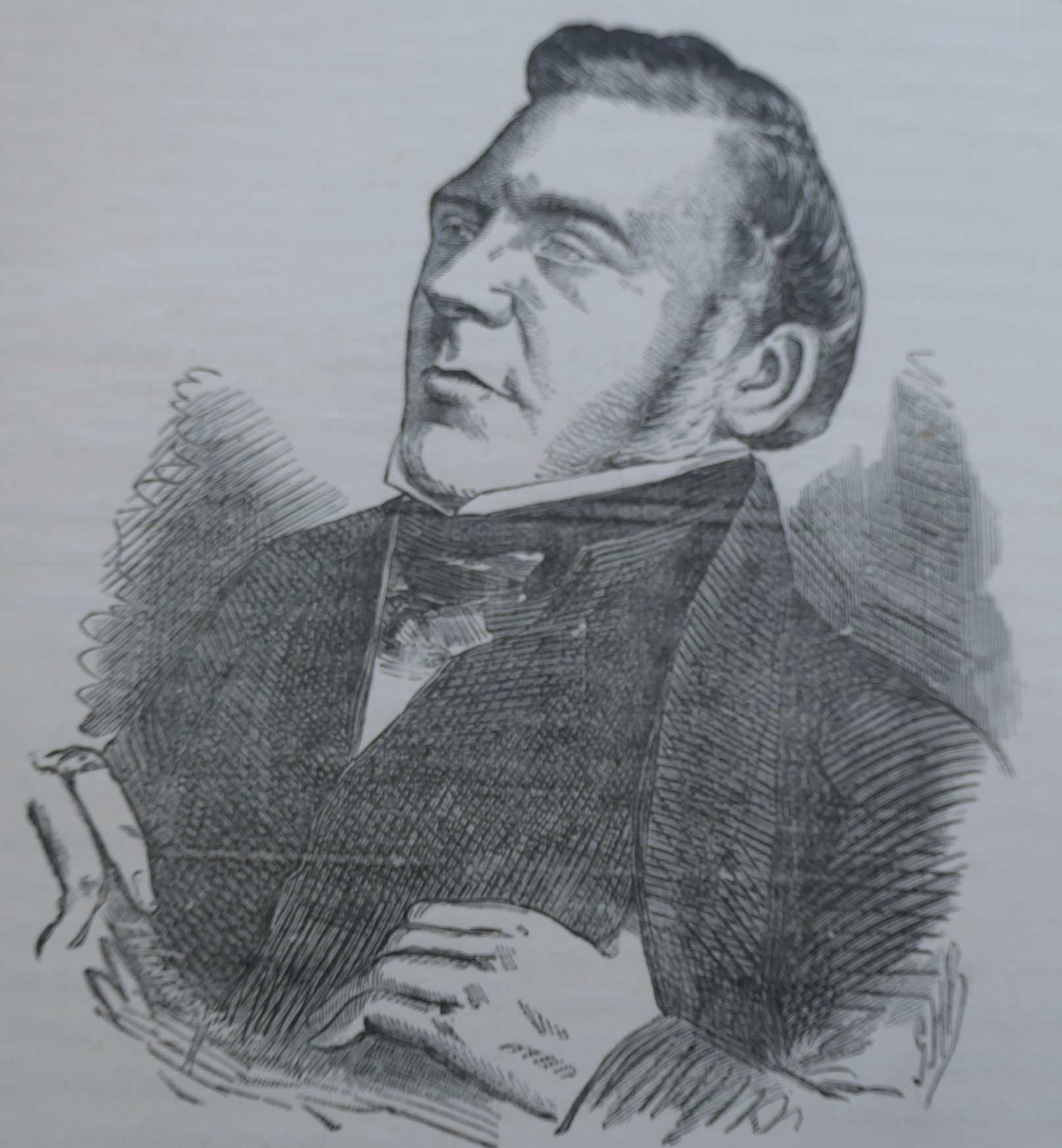
- Born: 1788
- Died: 1 July 1868
- Resting place: Key Hill Cemetery
- Occupations: Lawyer, schoolmaster, politician

George Edmonds (10 March 1788 – 1 July 1868) was an English teacher, lawyer, and scholar. He is principally remembered for his book A Universal Alphabet, Grammar, and Language. He was also a reforming journalist and leading Radical.

== Life ==
Edmonds was the son of Edward Edmonds, the Baptist minister of the Bond Street Chapel in Birmingham, and his second wife Sarah Bromfield. He was educated by his father, and then set up a school.

He became Birmingham's first Clerk of the Peace when that town was incorporated as a borough.

In 1812 he supported Thomas Attwood's campaign against orders in council. Later in the decade he was involved in agitation over the poor law administration. In 1819 he was one of those indicted for the gesture of proposing Sir Charles Wolseley as a local representative of Birmingham, which had no Member of Parliament. In the end Edmonds spent a year imprisoned in Warwick Castle. In the 1830s he was active in the Birmingham Political Union.

Edmonds married twice, the second time at the age of 79. He died at Abington Abbey near Northampton on 1 July 1868, and was buried at Key Hill Cemetery, Hockley, Birmingham.

== Works ==
A Universal Alphabet, Grammar, and Language enlarges upon John Wilkins's earlier An Essay towards a Real Character and a Philosophical Language. Edmonds proposed that one of the reasons for the nonadoption of Wilkins' universal language was that it was too hard to pronounce and that the words were too ugly when pronounced. He accordingly proposed a modified pronunciation system for the language.
