= Philosophical language =

Any constructed language that is constructed from first principles

A philosophical language is any constructed language that is constructed from first principles, sometimes following a classification. It is considered a type of engineered language. Philosophical languages were popular in Early Modern times, partly motivated by the goal of revising natural language for philosophical (i.e. scientific) purposes. The term ideal language is sometimes used near-synonymously, though more modern philosophical languages such as Toki Pona are less likely to make such exalted claims. The axioms and grammars of the languages together differ from commonly spoken languages.

== Overview ==
In most philosophical languages, words are constructed from a limited set of morphemes that are treated as "elemental" or "fundamental". "Philosophical language" is sometimes used synonymously with "taxonomic language". Vocabularies of oligosynthetic languages are made of compound words, which are coined from a small (theoretically minimal) set of morphemes. Languages like Toki Pona similarly use a limited set of root words but produce phrases which remain series of distinct words.

== History ==
Foreseen in Descartes' letter to Mersenne of November 20, 1629, work on philosophical languages was pioneered by Francis Lodwick (A Common Writing, 1647; The Groundwork or Foundation laid (or So Intended) for the Framing of a New Perfect Language and a Universal Common Writing, 1652), Sir Thomas Urquhart (Logopandecteision, 1652), George Dalgarno (Ars signorum, 1661), and John Wilkins (An Essay towards a Real Character, and a Philosophical Language, 1668). Those were systems of hierarchical classification that were intended to result in both spoken and written expression. In 1855, English writer George Edmonds modified Wilkins' system, leaving its taxonomy intact, but changing the grammar, orthography and pronunciation of the language in an effort to make it easier to speak and to read.

Gottfried Leibniz created lingua generalis (or lingua universalis) in 1678, aiming to create a lexicon of characters upon which the user might perform calculations that would yield true propositions automatically; as a side effect he developed binary calculus.

These projects aimed not only to reduce or model grammar, but also to arrange all human knowledge into "characters" or hierarchies. This idea ultimately led to the Encyclopédie, in the Age of Enlightenment. Under the entry Charactère, D'Alembert critically reviewed the projects of philosophical languages of the preceding century.

After the Encyclopédie, projects for a priori languages moved more and more to the fringe. However, from time to time, some authors continued to propose philosophical languages until the 20th century (for example, Ro, aUI) or even in the 21st century (Toki Pona).

=== Ideal language philosophy ===
Ideal language philosophy is contrasted with ordinary language philosophy. From about 1910 to 1930, analytic philosophers like Bertrand Russell and Ludwig Wittgenstein emphasized creating an ideal language for philosophical analysis, which would be free from the ambiguities of natural language that, in their opinion, often made for philosophical error. During this phase, Russell and Wittgenstein sought to understand language (and hence philosophical problems) by using formal logic to formalize the way in which philosophical statements are made. Wittgenstein developed a comprehensive system of logical atomism in his Tractatus Logico-Philosophicus (German: Logisch-Philosophische Abhandlung, 1921). He thereby argued that the universe is the totality of facts and not things: actual states of affairs and that these states of affairs can be expressed by the language of first-order predicate logic. Thus a picture of the universe can be construed by means of expressing atomic facts in the form of atomic propositions, and linking them using logical operators.

== See also ==
- Characteristica universalis
- Engineered language
- Ideal language philosophy
- Linguistic philosophy
- Natural semantic metalanguage

== Bibliography ==
- Umberto Eco, The Search for the Perfect Language, 1993.
- Alan Libert, A Priori Artificial Languages. Munich, Lincom Europa, 2000. ISBN 3-89586-667-9
