= Georg Ritschel =

Bohemian theologian

Georg Ritschel (13 February 1616, Deutsch Kahn – 28 December 1683, Hexham) was a Bohemian Protestant minister and educator. He associated with the Hartlib Circle, and was considered by Richard Popkin to belong to his "Third Force".

== Life ==
The eldest son of Georg Ritschel, a Bohemian, by Gertrude, his wife, he was born at Deutsch Kahn in Bohemia (now Luční Chvojno, part of Velké Chvojno, Czech Republic) on 13 February 1616. He was educated at the university of Strasburg (1633–40), and then, on the expulsion of Protestants from Bohemia, gave his inheritance to his younger brother rather than convert to Catholicism. Travelling to England, he arrived in Oxford, and was admitted into the Bodleian Library on 3 December 1641.

On the outbreak out of the First English Civil War, Ritschel left England and visited The Hague, Leyden, and Amsterdam. He obtained the post of tutor to the sons of the Prince of Transylvania; and in 1643 he travelled in Denmark, and spent over a year at Copenhagen and Sorø. In 1644 he visited Poland. There he was taken on as assistant to Comenius.

From Danzig Ritschel returned to England, where he was welcomed by Samuel Hartlib. He worked for several years on a project, supporting the writing of the Janua Rerum of Comenius. After a stay in London, he settled in Oxford, at Kettel Hall, as a member of Trinity College. From December 1646, he was able to study again in the Bodleian Library. In 1647 he broke off with Comenius, however, differing from him on philosophical matters, and the role given to Cyprian Kinner, a rival. He was appointed headmaster of Newcastle grammar school, on 29 August 1648.

In 1655 or 1656 Ritschel was appointed rector of Hexham, Northumberland, and as "pastor" there signed the address to the Protector Oliver Cromwell from the ministers of the Newcastle area, in August 1657. That year he may have been tutoring as Cromwell's Durham College was launched.

Ritschel died in possession of the vicarage of Hexham on 28 December 1683, and was buried in the chancel of his church, where an inscription was erected to his memory on a blue marble stone in the choir.

== Works ==
- Contemplationes metaphysicae (1648). It was dedicated to patrons, identified as Cheney Culpeper and Nicholas Stoughton.
- Dissertatio de ceremoniis Anglicanae (1661).

== Family ==
Of Ritschel's sons, George (1657–1717), B.A. of St. Edmund Hall, Oxford, succeeded him in the vicarage of Hexham; while John, of Trinity College, Oxford, and subsequently of Christ's College, Cambridge, was rector of St Andrew's Church, Bywell, Northumberland, from 1690 to 1705.

== Notes ==
Attribution

This article incorporates text from a publication now in the public domain: Lee, Sidney, ed. (1896). "Ritschel, George". Dictionary of National Biography. Vol. 48. London: Smith, Elder & Co.
