= AUI (constructed language) =

Constructed language

aUI
- Created by: John W. Weilgart
- Date: 1952
- Setting and usage: Designed to dissolve the discrepancy between homonymous and synonymous words
- Purpose: auxiliary language: logical or philosophical language; A Priori; oligosynthetic; aUI
- Sources: a priori

Language codes
- ISO 639-3: (a proposal to use aiu was rejected in 2019)
- Glottolog: None
- IETF: art-x-auii

aUI (constructed pronunciation: [auːiː]) is a philosophical and ideographic a priori language created in the 1950s by John W. Weilgart, a philosopher and psychoanalyst originally from Vienna, Austria. He described it as "the Language of Space", connoting universal communication, and published the fourth edition of the textbook in 1979; a philosophical description of each semantic element of the language was published in 1975.

In his psychotherapy work, Weilgart sometimes used client-created aUI formulations to reveal possible subconscious associations to problematic concepts. aUI can also be considered an experiment in applied cognitive lexical semantics, and Weilgart originally envisioned it serving as an international language for "Peace through Understanding".

== Characteristics ==
aUI has 31 morpheme-phonemes each with an associated meaning. That is, each morpheme corresponds to exactly one phoneme and exactly one sememe.

=== Characters ===
Character	Meaning	Letter	IPA	Description
	Space	a	[a]	The most open vowel, the mouth opens to a wide, open Space.
	Movement	e	[e]	A spiral galaxy’s primal cosmic movement: a front vowel, indicating forward Movement.
	Light	i	[i] or [ɪ]	Source of Light and rays spreading out: the quickest, high frequency vowel, reflecting that Light is the fastest thing in the universe.
	Life	o	[o]	A leaf – photosynthesis is the energy basis of earthly Life: pronounced short with the lips rounded.
	Human	u	[u]	Human legs or arms, depicting duality; similar to Chinese character.
	Time	A	[aː]	We measure Time in the elliptical orbits of earth and moon; an elongation of space: a long vowel, reflecting the passage of Time.
	Matter	E	[eː]	A brick-stone of solid Matter: a long-held vowel, reflecting how Matter lasts longer than movement.
Sound	Sound	I	[iː]	A sinusoidal Sound wave: a long-held vowel, reflecting how Sound travels more slowly than Light.
	Feeling	O	[oː]	Feelings are reflected in blood pressure and pulse: a back, lower (than U) vowel, as we often hold back our most inner Feelings, which well up inexplicably from below.
	Spirit / Mind	U	[uː]	Trinities are found within philosophy, psychology, and religions: a back, higher (than O) vowel, reflecting how our thoughts are often held back and how the Spirit is mysterious.
	Condition	Ø (formerly Q)	[œ] or [øː]	Conditions create restrictions similar to parentheses.
	Negation	Y	[y] preceding consonants; [j] preceding vowels	The minus sign Negates or opposes whatever stands below it and phonetically acts as the opposite: Y before a consonant acts like a vowel; y before a vowel, acts more like a consonant.
	Together	b	[b]	Two dots joined Together by an arc: a voiced bilabial stop articulated with both lips clearly pressed Together.
	Existence	c	[ʃ]	When one stands up, one Exists more prominently (Latin ex-istere, to stand out): an unvoiced fricative.
	Through	d	[d]	A line crossing Through another: a voiced alveolar stop in which the tongue crosses diagonally through the mouth.
	This	f	[f]	An abbreviated arrow pointing down to This: an unvoiced labiodental fricative where the lips point at a subject.
	Inside	g	[ɡ]	A dot Inside a circle: a voiced velar (guttural) stop pronounced Inside the throat.
	Question	h	[h]	A simplified Question mark: an unvoiced fricative as we breathe or gasp a Question, opening the mouth in astonishment.
Equal	Equal	j	[ʒ]	Equation sign joined so it can be written in one line: a voiced fricative, an even sound.
	Above	k	[k]	A dot Above a line like a musical quarter note: an unvoiced stop articulated with the tongue touching the upper palate.
	Around	L	[l]	A circle Around a circle: is a lateral consonant made by Rounding the tongue.
	Quality	m	[m]	Quality – a rounded form of Quantity – is sensed more as an intuitive feeling, and so is rounded like the Feeling symbol: a bilabial nasal, related to how smell can determine Quality.
	Quantity	n	[n]	An angular container to measure Quantity accurately: an alveolar nasal.
	Before	p	[p]	A dot Before a line: an unvoiced bilabial stop puffed out in Front of the lips.
	Positive	r	[ʀ] or [r]	A plus sign indicating Positive, Good.
	Thing	s	[s]	Round thing, closed in itself, lends concreteness to concepts: an unvoiced fricative and sibilant hissed between the teeth.
	Toward	t	[t]	A shortened arrow pointing Toward something: an unvoiced alveolar stop articulated with the tongue tipped ‘Toward’.
	Active	v	[v]	A bolt of lightning is most Active in nature; Power rising up into Action: a voiced labiodental fricative that requires vibration of the lips – voiced, as Actions require commitment.
	Power	w	[w]	Potential Power lying down: requires a little extra Power in keeping both the rounded lips partly open and taut and adding the voice.
	Relation	x	[x]	A double arrow Relating two objects: an unvoiced fricative articulated with friction, as Relations can cause friction.
	Part	z	[z]	Half of a round object cut aPart: a voiced dental fricative, as teeth bite parts off, and sounding as a ‘buzz-saw’.

Additionally, nasal vowels used for numerals are transcribed with carets:

0	1	2	3	4	5	6	7	8	9	10
⟨Ŷ⟩	⟨â⟩	⟨ê⟩	⟨î⟩	⟨û⟩	⟨ô⟩	⟨Â⟩	⟨Ê⟩	⟨Î⟩	⟨Û⟩	⟨Ô⟩

== Encoding and fonts ==
aUI is currently included in the unofficial ConScript Unicode Registry (CSUR), which assigns code points in the Private Use Area. aUI code points are mapped to the range U+E270 to U+E28F.

The eight “Aux” variant fonts of Kurinto (Kurinto Text Aux, Book Aux, Sans Aux, etc.) support aUI.

== See also ==
- Victor Klemperer and his book LTI – Lingua Tertii Imperii ISBN 9780826457776
