= Universal language =

Hypothetical language

Universal language may refer to a hypothetical or historical language spoken and understood by all or most of the world's people. In some contexts, it refers to a means of communication said to be understood by all humans. It may be the idea of an international auxiliary language for communication between groups speaking different primary languages. A similar concept can be found in pidgin language, which is actually used to facilitate understanding between two or more people with no common language. In other conceptions, it may be the primary language of all speakers, or the only existing language. Some religious and mythological traditions state that there was once a single universal language among all people, or shared by humans and supernatural beings.

In other traditions, there is less interest in or a general deflection of the question. The written Classical Chinese language is still read widely but pronounced differently by readers in China, Vietnam, Korea and Japan; for centuries it was a de facto universal literary language for a broad-based culture. In something of the same way Sanskrit in India and Nepal, and Pali in Sri Lanka and in Theravada countries of South-East Asia (Burma, Thailand, Cambodia) and Old Tamil in South India and Sri Lanka, were literary languages for many for whom they were not their mother tongue.

Comparably, the Latin language (qua Medieval Latin) was in effect a universal language of literati in the Middle Ages, and the language of the Vulgate Bible in the area of Catholicism, which covered most of Western Europe and parts of Northern Europe and Central Europe.

In a more practical fashion, trade languages, such as ancient Koine Greek, may be seen as a kind of real universal language, that was used for commerce.

In historical linguistics, monogenesis refers to the idea that all spoken human languages are descended from a single ancestral language spoken many thousands of years ago.

== Mythological and religious universal languages ==
Various religious texts, myths, and legends describe a state of humanity in which originally only one language was spoken.

In Jewish and Christian beliefs, the story of the Tower of Babel tells of a consequent "confusion of tongues" (the splintering of numerous languages from an original Adamic language) as a punishment from God.

Myths exist in other cultures describing the creation of multiple languages as an act of a god as well, such as the destruction of a 'knowledge tree' by Brahma in Indic tradition, or as a gift from the God Hermes in Greek myth. Other myths describe the creation of different languages as concurrent with the creation of different tribes of people, or due to supernatural events.

== Early modern history ==
Recognizable strands in the contemporary ideas on universal languages took form only in Early Modern Europe. In the early 17th century, some believed that a universal language would facilitate greater unity among mankind largely due to the subsequent spread of religion, specifically Christianity, as espoused in the works of Comenius. But there were ideas of a universal language apart from religion as well. A lingua franca or trade language was nothing very new; but an international auxiliary language was a natural wish in light of the gradual decline of Latin. Literature in vernacular languages became more prominent with the Renaissance. Over the course of the 18th century, learned works largely ceased to be written in Latin. According to Colton Booth (Origin and Authority in Seventeenth-Century England (1994) p. 174) "The Renaissance had no single view of Adamic language and its relation to human understanding." The question was more exactly posed in the work of Francis Bacon.

In the vast writings of Gottfried Leibniz can be found many elements relating to a possible universal language, specifically a constructed language, a concept that gradually came to replace that of a rationalized Latin as the natural basis for a projected universal language. Leibniz conceived of a characteristica universalis (also see mathesis universalis), an "algebra" capable of expressing all conceptual thought. This algebra would include rules for symbolic manipulation, what he called a calculus ratiocinator. His goal was to put reasoning on a firmer basis by reducing much of it to a matter of calculation that many could grasp. The characteristica would build on an alphabet of human thought.

Leibniz's work is bracketed by some earlier mathematical ideas of René Descartes, and the satirical attack of Voltaire on Panglossianism. Descartes's ambitions were far more modest than Leibniz's, and also far more successful, as shown by his wedding of algebra and geometry to yield what we now know as analytic geometry. Decades of research on symbolic artificial intelligence have not brought Leibniz's dream of a characteristica any closer to fruition.

Other 17th-century proposals for a 'philosophical' (i.e. universal) language include those by Francis Lodwick, Thomas Urquhart (possibly parodic), George Dalgarno (Ars signorum, 1661), and John Wilkins (An Essay towards a Real Character and a Philosophical Language, 1668). The classification scheme in Roget's Thesaurus ultimately derives from Wilkins's Essay.

Candide, a satire written by Voltaire, took aim at Leibniz as Dr. Pangloss, with the choice of name clearly putting universal language in his sights, but satirizing mainly the optimism of the projector as much as the project. The argument takes the universal language itself no more seriously than the ideas of the speculative scientists and virtuosi of Jonathan Swift's Laputa. For the like-minded of Voltaire's generation, universal language was tarred as fool's gold with the same brush as philology with little intellectual rigour, and universal mythography, as futile and arid directions.

In the 18th century, some rationalist natural philosophers sought to recover a supposed Edenic language. It was assumed that education inevitably took people away from an innate state of goodness they possessed, and therefore there was an attempt to see what language a human child brought up in utter silence would speak. This was assumed to be the Edenic tongue, or at least the lapsarian tongue.

Others attempted to find a common linguistic ancestor to all tongues; there were, therefore, multiple attempts to relate esoteric languages to Hebrew (e.g. Basque and Irish), as well as the beginnings of comparative linguistics.

== Modern history ==
The constructed language movement produced such languages as Esperanto (1887), Latino sine flexione (1903), Ido (1907), Interlingue (1922), and Interlingua (1951).

English remains the dominant language of international business and global communication through the influence of global media and the former British Empire that had established the use of English in regions around the world such as North America, Africa, Australia and New Zealand. However, English is not the only language used in major international organizations, because many countries do not recognize English as a universal language. For instance, the United Nations use six languages — Arabic, Chinese, English, French, Russian, and Spanish.

The early ideas of a universal language with complete conceptual classification by categories is still debated on various levels. Michel Foucault believed such classifications to be subjective, citing Borges' fictional Celestial Emporium of Benevolent Knowledge's Taxonomy as an illustrative example.

== See also ==
- Asemic writing
- aUI
- Blinking
- Body language
- Bouba/kiki effect
- Code
- Emoji
- Facial expression
- Gibberish
- Global language system
- International Sign
- Pidgin
- Semiotics
- Sense
- Sign
- Sign language
- Somatosensory system
- Stick figure
- Symbol
- Universal translator
- Universal grammar
- Visible Speech
- Whistled language

== Bibliography ==
- Slaughter, M. M. (1982). Universal Languages and Scientific Taxonomy in the Seventeenth Century. Cambridge University Press. ISBN 978-0-521-24477-0.
- Sweet, Henry (1911). "Universal Languages" . Encyclopædia Britannica (11th ed.).
