= Francis Lodwick =

Pioneer of a priori languages (1619–1694)

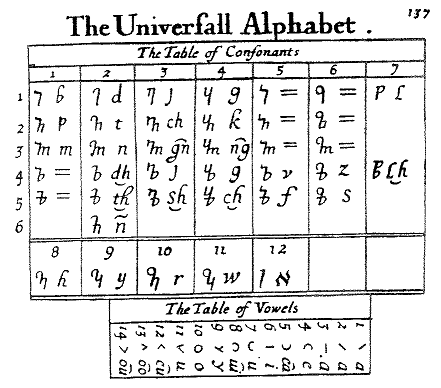
Table of Lodwick's Universal Alphabet (1686)

Francis Lodwick FRS (or Lodowick; 1619–1694) was a pioneer of a priori languages (what in the seventeenth century was called a 'philosophical language').

== Biography ==
Francis Lodwick was a merchant of Flemish origin who lived in London. His name appears in A Collection of the Names of the Merchants living in and about the City of London (1677), with the address "Fan-church street" (Fenchurch Street). He did not have any higher education and was admitted as a Fellow to the Royal Society at the age of 60.

John Aubrey (1626–1697) reported that there was a group of men taking up the task of constructing a philosophical language left unfinished by John Wilkins (d. 1672). This group included Lodwick, besides Andrew Paschall (c. 1630–c. 1696), Thomas Pigott, Robert Hooke and John Ray, the latter being former members of Wilkin's original committee. Lodwick had been working on a universal alphabet for some time, and Wilkins had borrowed some of Lodwick's papers for his 1668 Essay. Hooke notes in his diary for 12 November 1673 that Lodwick had lent him a revised version of his universal alphabet. For 10 July 1675, Hooke notes that Lodwick had discussed the universal character with him and on 28 that he (Hooke) himself had written in the character. The group maintained correspondence until at least 1682. Lodwick's alphabet consists of a system of representing consonants systematically; symbols indicating place of articulation (labial, dental, palatal, velar, sibilant) are modified by indication of the manner of articulation (voiced, voiceless, aspirated, nasal). Vowels are added as diacritics. This approach is entirely parallel to the Tengwar alphabet, developed by J. R. R. Tolkien in the 1930s.

Lodwick may have been acquainted with Daniel Defoe. Francis' nephew Charles Lodwik (1658–1724), Mayor of New York City in 1694, signed at Defoe's marriage as a witness, and Francis may have introduced Defoe to "Roscommon's Academy", a group founded by Lord Roscommon in 1683.

L. L. Zamenhof, creator of Esperanto, the most widely used constructed international auxiliary language, chose Ludwik as his non-Jewish name in honor of Francis Lodwick.

== Works ==
- 1647 A Common Writing: Whereby two, although not understanding one the others Language, yet by the helpe thereof, may communicate their minds one to another
- 1652 The Ground-Work, Or Foundation Laid, (or so intended) For the Framing of a New Perfect Language: And an Vniversall or Common Writing. And presented to the consideration of the Learned
- ca. 1675, A Country Not Named
- 1686 An Essay towards An Universal Alphabet, Philosophical Transactions 16, pp. 126-37.

== See also ==
- Cave Beck
- George Dalgarno
- John Wilkins

== Bibliography ==
- Cram, David and Jaap Maat, Universal language schemes in the 17th century, In Auroux, Koerner, Niederehe, Versteegh (eds.), History of the Language Sciences, Berlin/New York: Walter de Gruyter, 2000.
- Eco, Umberto, The search for the perfect language, Fontana Press, 1997, ISBN 0-00-686378-7, pp. 260-268
- Lewis, Rhodri, The efforts of the Aubrey correspondence group to revise John Wilkins’ Essay (1668) and their context, Historiographia Linguistica 28 (2001), 331-364.
- Poole, William, A Rare Early-Modern Utopia: Francis Lodwick’s A Country Not Named (c. 1675), Utopian Studies 15 (2004), 115-37.
- Poole, William, The Genesis Narrative in the Circle of Robert Hooke and Francis Lodwick, in Hessayon and Keene (eds.), Scripture and Scholarship in Early Modern England, Aldershot: Ashgate, 2005.
- Poole, William, Francis Lodwick’s Creation: Theology and Natural Philosophy in the Early Royal Society., Journal of the History of Ideas, 2005.
- Salmon, Vivian, The Works of Francis Lodwick, London: Longman, 1972.
