= George Dalgarno =

Scottish intellectual (d. 1687)

George Dalgarno (c. 1616 – 1687) was a Scottish intellectual interested in linguistic problems. Originally from Aberdeen, he later worked as a schoolteacher in Oxford in collaboration with John Wilkins, although the two parted company intellectually in 1659.

== Life ==
Dalgarno matriculated at Marischal College, Aberdeen, in 1631. Subsequently, he was a schoolteacher in Oxford in the 1650s. In 1657, he was encouraged to upgrade a system of shorthand on which he was working, by Samuel Hartlib, to a more ambitious universal system and he published on the subject later the same year. This effort brought him into contact with members of the Oxford Philosophical Club, one of the precursors of the Royal Society.

== Works ==
Dalgarno devised a communication system using fingerspelling. He authored the book Didascalocophus or the Deaf and Dumb man's tutor (1680), which proposed a totally new linguistic system for use by deaf mutes.

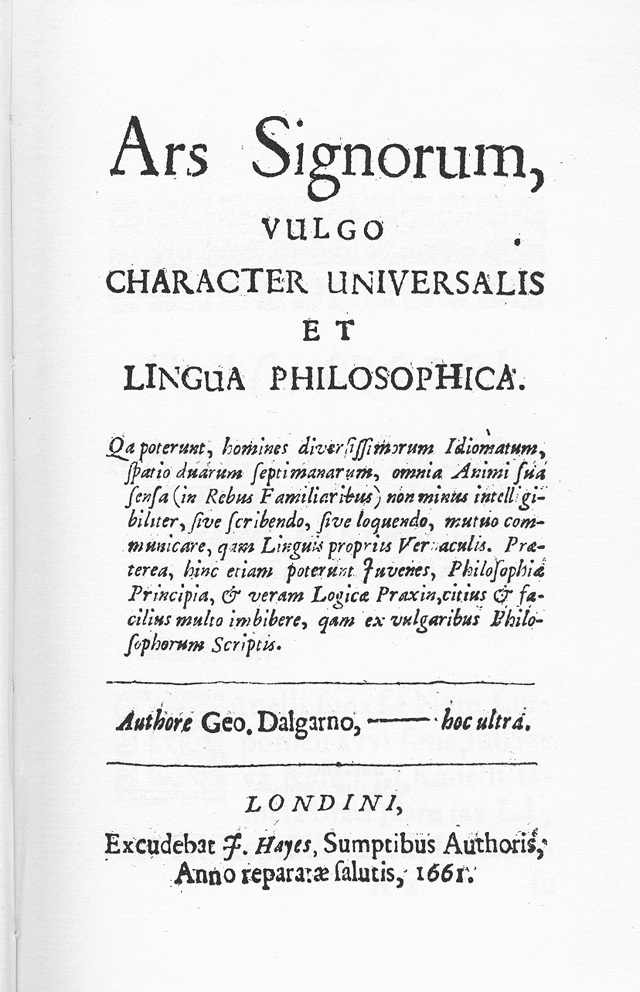
Title page of Dalgarno's Ars Signorum (1661).

Dalgarno was also interested in constructing what he called a 'philosophical language', now more usually referred to as universal language. A modern translation of his Ars signorum (Art of Signs, 1661) was published in 2001 in an edition that also includes his autobiography and other manuscript writings.
