= John Wilkins =

English natural philosopher (1614–1672)

The Right Reverend John Wilkins FRS
- Bishop of Chester
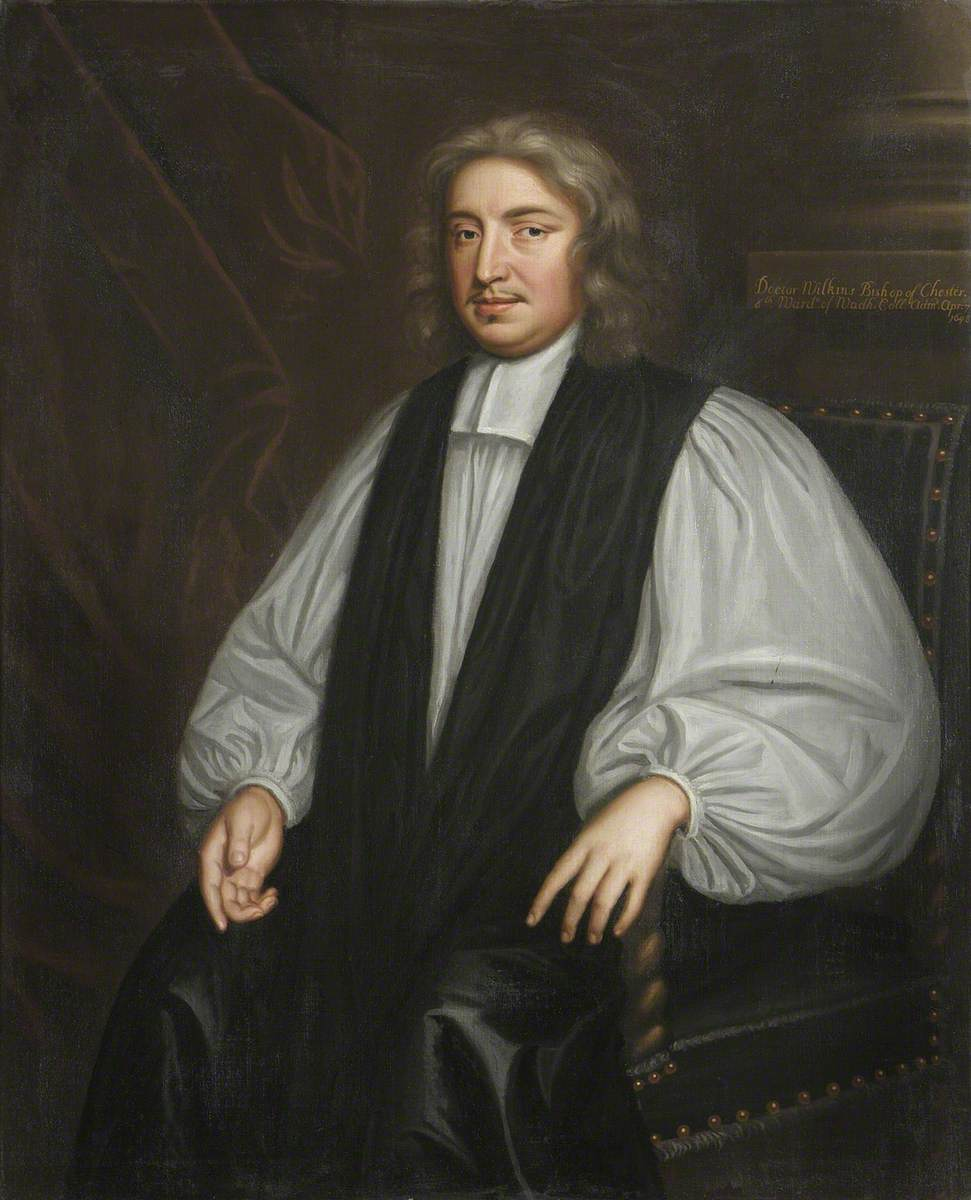
- Diocese: Diocese of Chester
- In office: 1668–1672 (death)
- Predecessor: George Hall
- Successor: John Pearson
- Other post: Dean of Ripon (1663–1672)

Orders
- Consecration: 15 November 1668 by Gilbert Sheldon

Personal details
- Born: 14 February 1614 Fawsley, Northamptonshire
- Died: 19 November 1672 (aged 58) Chancery Lane, London
- Buried: St Lawrence Jewry, London
- Denomination: Anglican
- Spouse: Robina Cromwell (m.1656)
- Profession: Clergyman, natural philosopher, author, administrator
- Education: New Inn Hall, Oxford; Magdalen Hall, Oxford

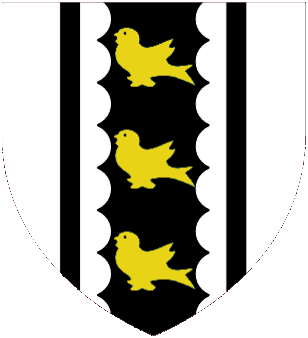
Arms: Argent on a pale engrailed cotised plain Sable three martlets Or.

John Wilkins (14 February 1614 – 19 November 1672) was an English Anglican clergyman, natural philosopher, and author, and was one of the founders of the Royal Society. He was Bishop of Chester from 1668 until his death.

Wilkins is one of the few persons to have headed a college at both the University of Oxford and the University of Cambridge. He was a polymath, although not one of the most important scientific innovators of the period. His personal qualities were brought out, and obvious to his contemporaries, in reducing political tension in Interregnum Oxford, in founding the Royal Society on non-partisan lines, and in efforts to reach out to Protestant Nonconformists. He was one of the founders of the new natural theology compatible with the science of the time. He is particularly known for An Essay towards a Real Character and a Philosophical Language (1668) in which, amongst other things, he proposed a universal language and an integrated system of measurement, similar to the metric system.

Wilkins lived in a period of great political and religious controversy, yet managed to remain on working terms with men of all political stripes; he was key in setting the Church of England on the path toward comprehension for as many sects as possible, "and toleration for the rest". Gilbert Burnet called him "the wisest clergyman I ever knew. He was a lover of mankind, and had a delight in doing good." His stepdaughter married John Tillotson, who became Archbishop of Canterbury in 1691.

== Early life ==
He was probably born at Canons Ashby, Northamptonshire, though some sources say Fawsley; his father Walter Wilkins (died 1623) was a goldsmith and his mother Jane Dod was the daughter of John Dod, a well-known conforming Puritan. His mother then remarried to Francis Pope, and their son, Walter Pope was a half-brother.

Wilkins was educated at a school in Oxford run by Edward Sylvester, and matriculated at New Inn Hall. He then moved to Magdalen Hall, Oxford where his tutor was John Tombes, and graduated with a BA degree in 1631, an MA degree in 1634. He studied astronomy with John Bainbridge.

Wilkins went to Fawsley in 1637, a sheep-farming place with little population, dominated by the Knightley family, to whom he and then Dod may have ministered; Richard Knightley had been Dod's patron there. He was ordained a priest of the Church of England in Christ Church Cathedral in February 1638. He then became chaplain successively to Lord Saye and Sele, and by 1641 to Lord Berkeley. In 1644 he became chaplain to Prince Charles Louis, nephew of King Charles I, who was then in England.

== In London, Oxford and Cambridge ==
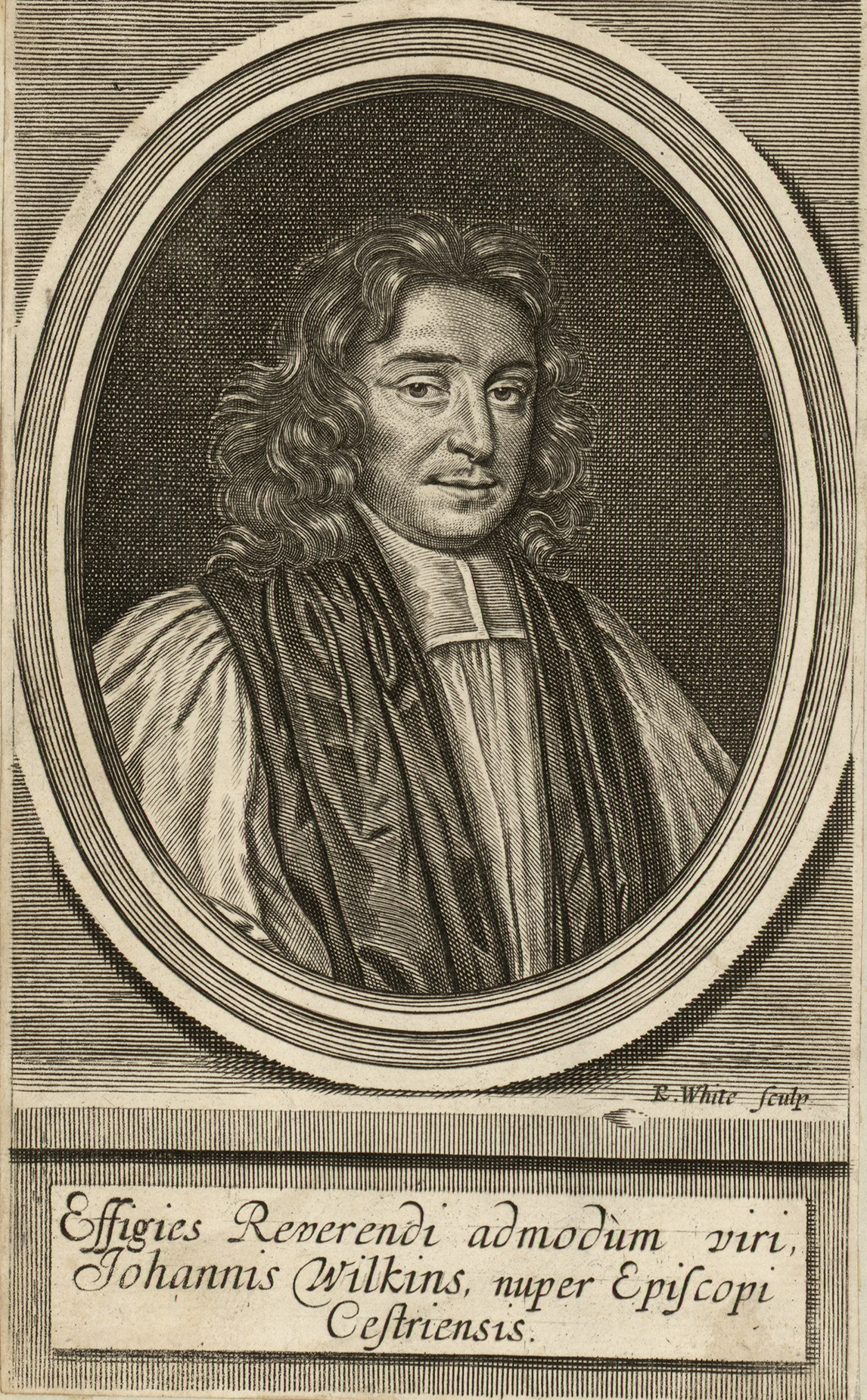
An 18th-century engraving of John Wilkins, Chester

Wilkins was one of the group of savants, interested in experimental philosophy, who gathered round Charles Scarburgh, the royalist physician who arrived in London in summer 1646 after the fall of Oxford to the parliamentarian forces. The group included George Ent, Samuel Foster, Francis Glisson, Jonathan Goddard, Christopher Merrett, and John Wallis.

Others of Scarburgh's circle were William Harvey and Seth Ward. This London group, the Gresham College group of 1645, was described much later by Wallis, who mentions also Theodore Haak, anchoring it also to the Palatine exiles; there are clear connections to the Wilkins Oxford Philosophical Club, another and less remote precursor to the Royal Society.

From 1648 Charles Louis was able to take up his position as Elector of the Palatinate on the Rhine, as a consequence of the Peace of Westphalia. Wilkins travelled to continental Europe, and according to Anthony Wood visited Heidelberg.

In 1648 Wilkins became Warden of Wadham College in Oxford, and under him the college prospered. He fostered political and religious tolerance and drew talented minds to the college, including Christopher Wren. Although he was a supporter of Oliver Cromwell, Royalists placed their sons in his charge. From those interested in experimental science, he drew together a significant group known as the Oxford Philosophical Club, which by 1650 had been constituted with a set of rules. Besides some of the London group (Goddard, Wallis, Ward, and Wren who was a young protégé of Scarburgh), it included (in the account of Thomas Sprat) Ralph Bathurst, Robert Boyle, William Petty, Lawrence Rooke, Thomas Willis, and Matthew Wren. Robert Hooke was gradually recruited into the Wilkins group: he arrived at Christ Church, Oxford in 1653, working his way to an education, became assistant to Willis, became known to Wilkins (possibly via Richard Busby) as a technician, and by 1658 was working with Boyle.

In 1656, Wilkins married Oliver Cromwell's youngest sister, Robina French (née Cromwell), who had been widowed in 1655 when her husband Peter French, a canon of Christ Church, Oxford, had died. Wilkins thereby joined a high stratum of Parliamentary society, and the couple used rooms in Whitehall Palace. Shortly before his death, Oliver Cromwell arranged for Wilkins a new appointment as Master of Trinity College, Cambridge, an appointment that was confirmed by Richard Cromwell who succeeded his father as Lord Protector. Wilkins was there long enough to befriend and become a patron of Isaac Barrow.

== After the Restoration ==
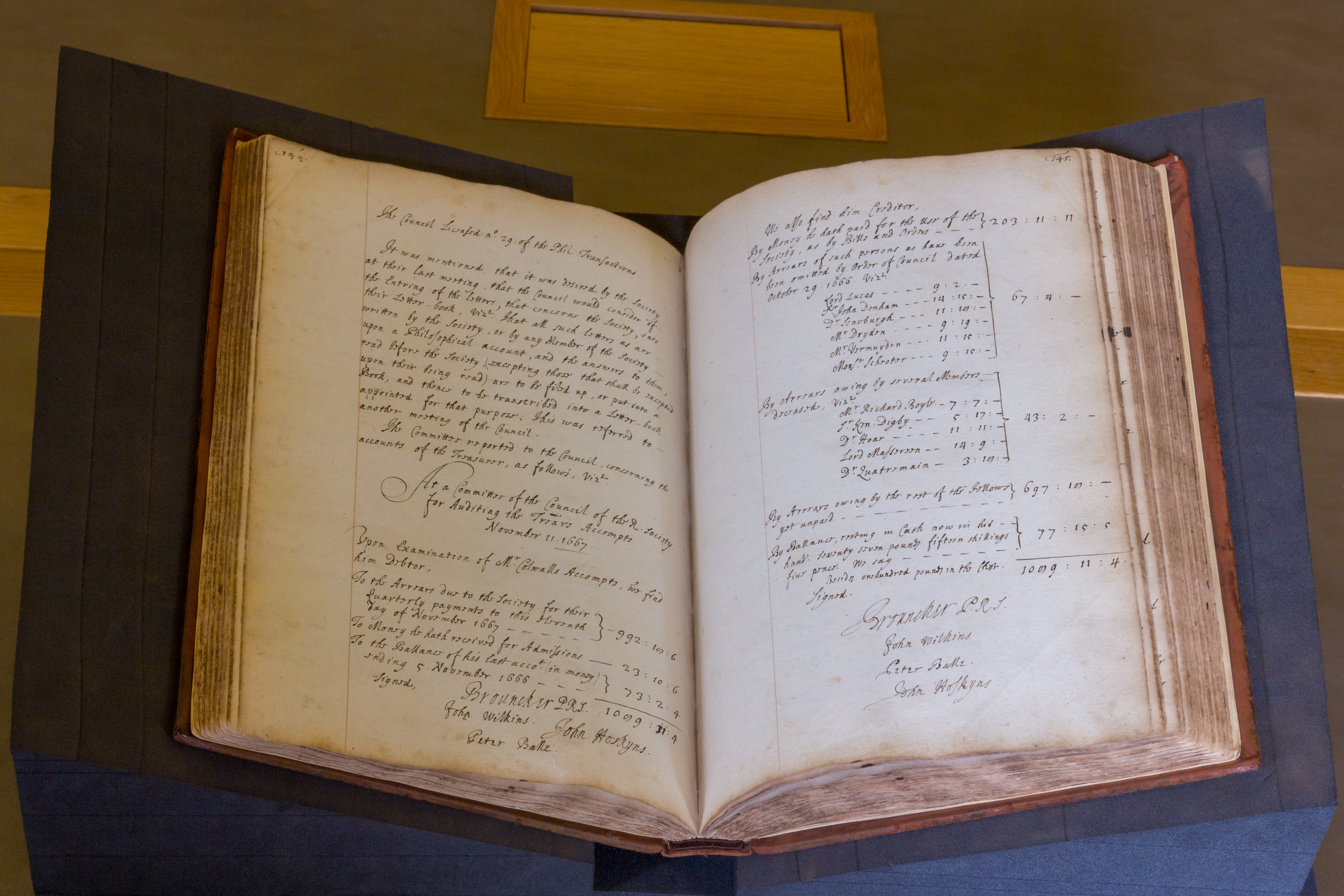
Wilkins' signature as Secretary, signing off the 1667 accounts of the Royal Society, from the minutes book

Upon the Restoration in 1660, the new authorities deprived Wilkins of the position given him by Cromwell; he gained appointment as prebendary of York and rector of Cranford, Middlesex. In 1661, he was reduced to preacher at Gray's Inn, lodging with his friend Seth Ward. In 1662, he became vicar of St Lawrence Jewry, London. He suffered in the Great Fire of London, losing his vicarage, library and scientific instruments.

Possessing strong scientific tastes, Wilkins was a founding member of the Royal Society and was soon elected fellow and one of the Society's two secretaries: he shared the work with Henry Oldenburg, whom he had met in Oxford in 1656.

== Bishop ==
Wilkins became vicar of Polebrook, Northamptonshire, in 1666; prebendary of Exeter in 1667; and in the following year, prebendary of St Paul's and bishop of Chester. He owed his position as bishop to the influence of George Villiers, 2nd Duke of Buckingham. Buckingham's approach to the religious problem of the day was comprehension, something less than religious tolerance but aimed at least at bringing in the Presbyterians among the nonconformists to the Church of England by some peaceful form of negotiation and arrangement. Wilkins too thought along these lines. He had been a sympathetic reader of John Humfrey's 1661 justification of his acceptance of re-ordination by William Piers, having already once been ordained in the Presbyterian style by a classis.

As Wilkins was ordained, he spoke out against the use of penal laws, and immediately tried to gather support from other moderate bishops to see what concessions to the nonconformists could be made.

A serious effort was made in 1668 to secure a scheme of comprehension, with William Bates, Richard Baxter and Thomas Manton for the dissenters meeting Wilkins and Hezekiah Burton. Wilkins felt the Presbyterians could be brought within the Church of England, while the Independent separatists were left outside. It fell through by late summer, with Manton blaming John Owen for independent scheming for general toleration with Buckingham, and Baxter pointing the finger at the House of Lords.

== Death ==
Wilkins died in London, most likely from the medicines used to treat his kidney stones and urinary retention.

== Works ==
His numerous written works include:

- The Discovery of a World in the Moone (1638)
- A Discourse Concerning a New Planet (1640)
- Mercury, or the Secret and Swift Messenger (1641), the first English-language book on cryptography
- Ecclesiastes (1646)
- Mathematicall Magick (1648)
- A Discourse Concerning the Beauty of Providence (1649)
- A discourse concerning the gift of prayer: shewing what it is, wherein it consists and how far it is attainable by industry (1651)
- Vindiciae academiarum (1654), with Seth Ward
- An Essay towards a Real Character, and a Philosophical Language (1668), in which he proposes a new universal language for the use of natural philosophers.
- Of the Principles and Duties of Natural Religion, London, UK, 1675

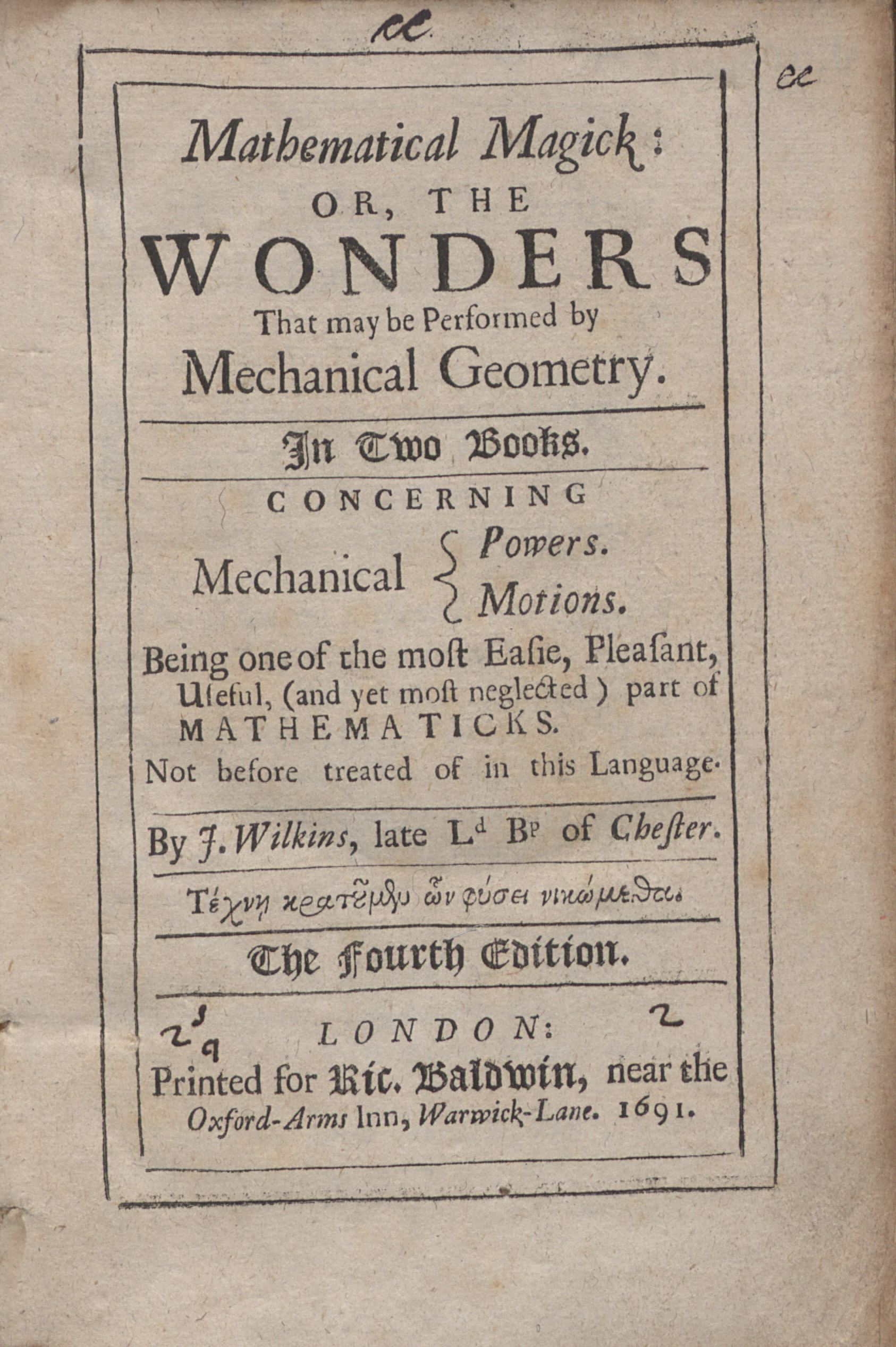
Mathematical magick, 4th edition (1691)

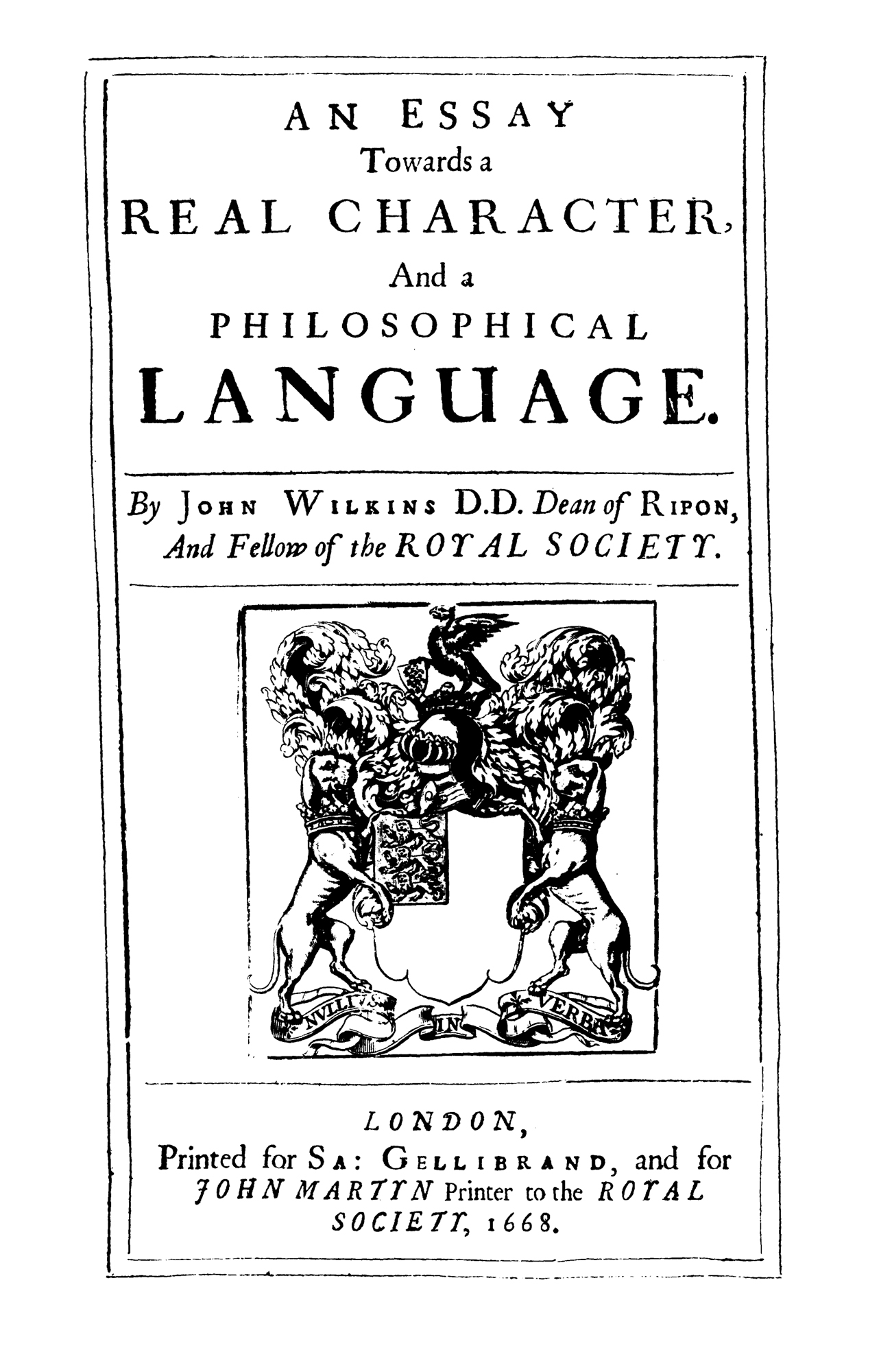
Frontispiece of John Wilkins "An Essay towards a Real Character and a Philosophical Language" (1668)

The early scientific works were in a popular vein, and have links to the publications of Francis Godwin. The Discovery of a World in the Moone (1638) was followed up by A Discourse Concerning a New Planet (1640). The author highlights the similarities between the Earth and the Moon. Based on these similarities, he proposes the idea that the Moon would house living beings, the Selenites. Godwin's The Man in the Moone was also published in 1638. In 1641 Wilkins published an anonymous treatise entitled Mercury, or The Secret and Swift Messenger. This was a small work on cryptography; it may well have been influenced by Godwin's Nuncius inanimatus (1629). His Mathematical Magic (1648) was divided into two sections, one on traditional mechanical devices such as the lever, and the other, more speculative, on machines. It drew on many authors, both classical writers and moderns such as Guidobaldo del Monte and Marin Mersenne. It alludes to Godwin's The Man in the Moone, for bird-powered flight. These were light if learned works and admitted both blue-sky thinking, such as the possibility of the Moon being inhabitable, and references to figures on the "occult" side: Trithemius, John Dee, the Rosicrucians, Robert Fludd.

Ecclesiastes (1646) is a plea for a plain style in preaching, avoiding rhetoric and scholasticism, for a more direct and emotional appeal. It analysed the whole field of available Biblical commentary, for the use of those preparing sermons, and was reprinted many times. It is noted as a transitional work, both in the move away from Ciceronian style in preaching, and in the changing meaning of elocution to the modern sense of vocal production.

A Discourse Concerning the Beauty of Providence (1649) took an unfashionable line, namely that divine providence was more inscrutable than current interpreters were saying. It added to the reputation of Wilkins, when the Stuarts returned to the throne, to have warned that the short term reading of events as managed by God was risky.

In 1654, Wilkins joined with Seth Ward in writing Vindiciae academiarum, a reply to John Webster's Academiarum Examen, one of many attacks at the time on the universities of Oxford and Cambridge, and their teaching methods. This attack had more clout than most: it was dedicated to John Lambert, a top military figure, and was launched during Barebone's Parliament, when radical change seemed on the cards. Wilkins (as NS) provided an open letter to Ward; and Ward (as HD, also taking the final letters of his name therefore) replied at greater length. Wilkins makes two main points: first, Webster is not addressing the actual state of the universities, which were not as wedded to old scholastic ways, Aristotle, and Galen, as he said; and secondly Webster's mixture of commended authors, without fuller understanding of the topics, really was foolish. In this approach Wilkins had to back away somewhat from his writings of the late 1630s and early 1640s. He made light of this in the way of pointing to Alexander Ross, a very conservative Aristotelian who had attacked his own astronomical works, as a more suitable target for Webster. This exchange was part of the process of the new experimental philosophers throwing off their associations with occultists and radicals.

In 1668 he published his Essay towards a Real Character and a Philosophical Language. In it he attempted to create a universal language to replace Latin as a completely unambiguous tongue with which scholars and philosophers could communicate. One aspect of this work was the suggestion of an integrated system of measurement, similar to the metric system but which was never promoted.

In his lexicographical work he collaborated with William Lloyd. The Ballad of Gresham College (1663), a gently satirical ode to the Society, refers to this project:

A Doctor counted very able
Designes that all Mankynd converse shall,
Spite o' th' confusion made att Babell,
By Character call'd Universall.
How long this character will be learning,
That truly passeth my discerning.

== See also ==
- The Analytical Language of John Wilkins (essay by Jorge Luis Borges)

== Bibliography ==
- Wright Henderson, Patrick Arkley. The Life and Times of John Wilkins. Project Gutenberg.
- Funke, O (1959). "On the Sources of John Wilkins' philosophical language". English Studies. Vol. XL.
- Shapiro, Barbara J (1968). John Wilkins 1614–1672: An Intellectual Biography..
- Dolezal, Fredric (1985). Forgotten But Important Lexicographers: John Wilkins and William Lloyd. a Modern Approach to Lexicography Before Johnson.
- Slaughter, M. M. (1982). Universal Languages and Scientific Taxonomy in the Seventeenth Century. Cambridge University Press. ISBN 978-0-521-24477-0.
- Subbiondo, JL, ed. (1992). John Wilkins and 17th-Century British Linguistics.
- ———————— (July 2001). "Educational Reform in Seventeenth-Century England and John Wilkins' Philosophical Language". Language & Communication. 21 (3): 273–84. doi:10.1016/S0271-5309(00)00014-8.
- Davies, Cliff S L (2004). "The Family and Connections of John Wilkins, 1614–72". Oxoniensia. LXIX.

Academic offices
Preceded by John Pitt	Warden of Wadham College, Oxford; 1648–1659	Succeeded by Walter Blandford
Preceded by John Arrowsmith	Master of Trinity College, Cambridge; 1659–1660	Succeeded by Henry Ferne
Church of England titles
Preceded by Vacant	Dean of Ripon; 1663–1672	Succeeded by John Neile
Preceded by George Hall	Bishop of Chester; 1668–1672	Succeeded by John Pearson
