= François Cammas =

French painter

Lambert-François-Thérèse Cammas
- Born: 1743; Toulouse, France
- Died: 1804 (aged 60–61); Toulouse
- Occupations: Painter; architect; engineer
- Father: Guillaume Cammas

Lambert-François-Thérèse Cammas (1743–1804) was a French painter, architect, and engineer.

== Life ==
Cammas was born in Toulouse, France in 1743. He was instructed in the rudiments of art by his father, Guillaume Cammas, an architect who designed the façade of the Hôtel-de-Ville at Toulouse. He later went to Rome, where, in 1770, he became a professor at the Academy of St. Luke. On his return to France, he protested against the bad taste which had disfigured the majestic outlines of the noblest churches with mean and ridiculous ornaments, and made numerous designs for the restoration of almost all the religious edifices of the city of Toulouse.

Cammas died in Toulouse in 1804. His picture representing Louis XVI recalling the Parliaments exiled during the reign of Louis XV is in the museum of his native city.
