= Hôtel d'Astorg et de Saint-Germain =

Renaissance hôtel particulier in Toulouse, France

Coordinates: 43.601°N 1.444°E

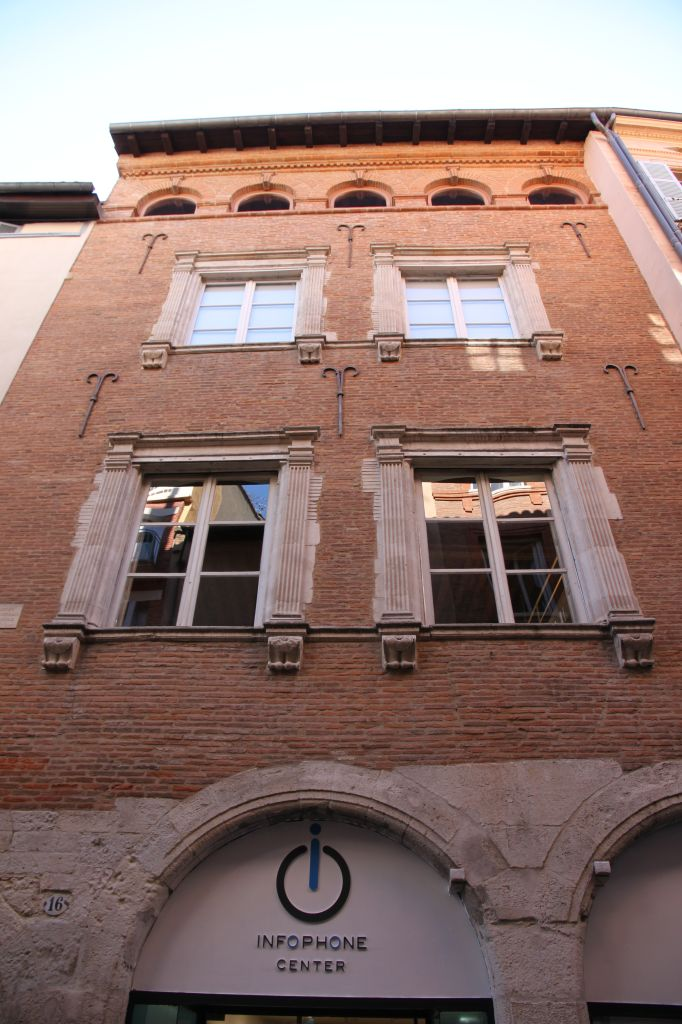
Facade of the rue des Changes.

The Hôtel d'Astorg et de Saint-Germain in Toulouse, France, is a Renaissance hôtel particulier (palace) of the 16th and 17th centuries.

== History ==
The Hotel d'Astorg and Saint Germain is located at 16, rue des Changes, in the historical center of Toulouse and was built between 1550 and 1570 for the Capitoul Guillaume de Saint-Germain, then reworked by the captain Jean d'Astorg.

== Description ==
Hôtel d'Astorg-Saint-Germain stands on one of the major arteries of Renaissance Toulouse, a road which was known in the Roman period as the Cardo maximus (north-south road) ans linked Saint-Sernin basilica, the Capitole and the parliament. Built in the late sixteenth century, the hôtel retains much of the old merchant house.

In 1568 the merchant Jean Astorg rebuilt part of the house. The building overlooking the street comprised, on the ground floor, a series of shops and a side door which opened onto a covered passage which, in turn, gave access to the main courtyard, the latter having a ceremonial purpose rather than a practical one. Unusually, this hôtel retains both its outside wooden staircases and the passageways which led to the buildings around the courtyard. While wood was a common building material in the Renaissance, few decorated examples (moulded balusters, facing scrolls) have survived to the present day.

== High windows ==
For a long time attributed solely to Guillaume de Saint-Germain, the house was in truth partially built by the burgher Jean Astorg. The latter belonged to the financial elite who were regularly sought out by the capitouls in period of crisis (war efforts). For the decoration of his new building at the back of the courtyard he decided to imitate the windows of his neighbour Pierre Delpech. Such imitation was prevalent throughout the century, and amounted to honorific appropriation. These windows possess impressive frames, known as chambranle à crossettes, supported by four short pilasters. The latter, adhering to the principles of manneristic aesthetic founded on surprise, do not play a structural role but instead appear to be suspended and dependant on the frame they should, by rights, be supporting.

== Pictures ==
Hôtel d'Astorg

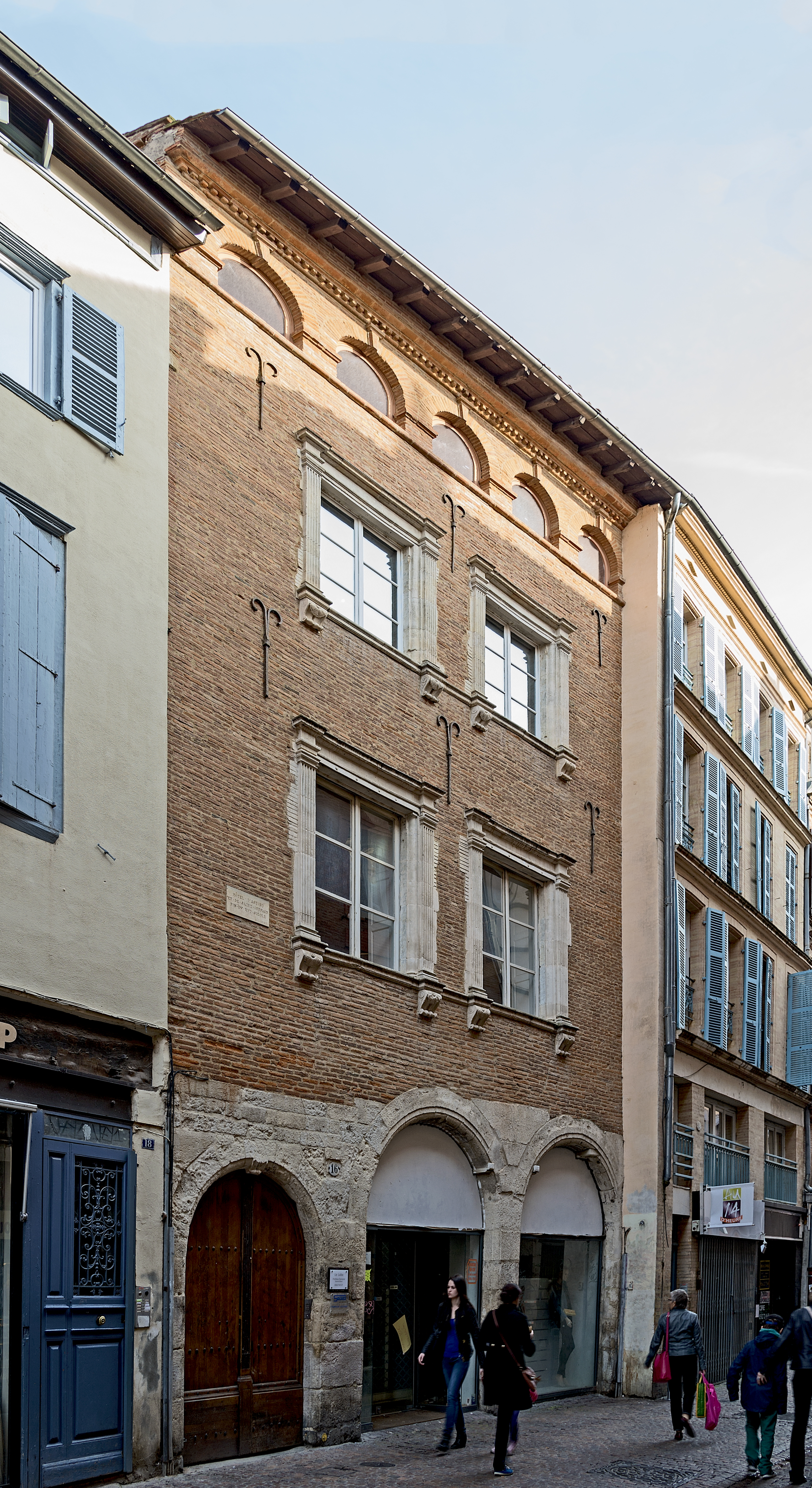
Hôtel d'Astorg-Saint-Germain

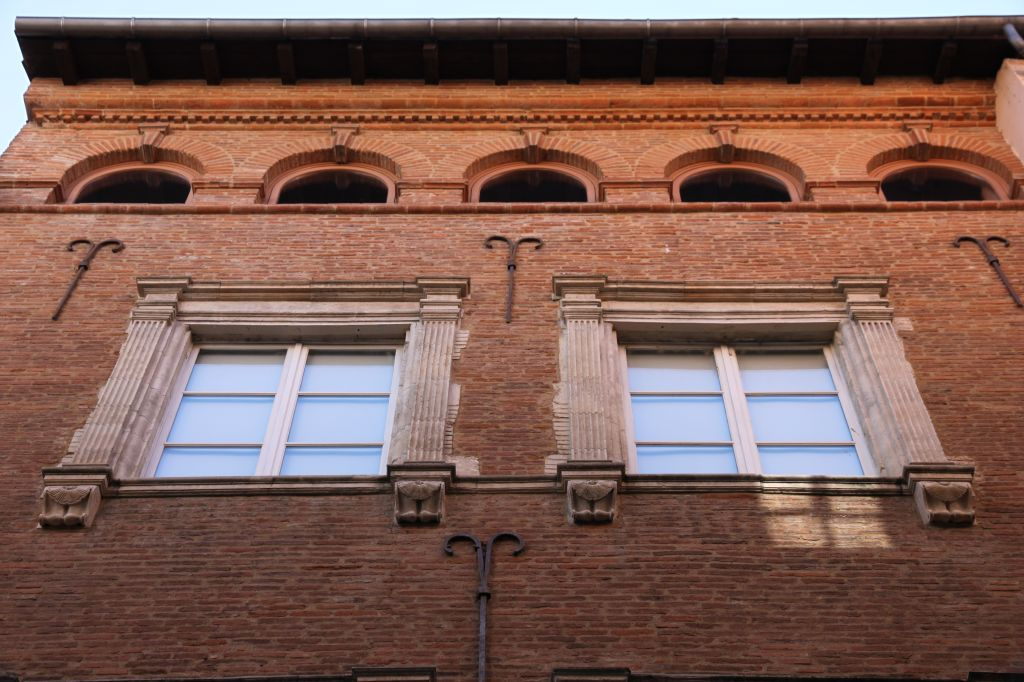
Façade overlooking the street

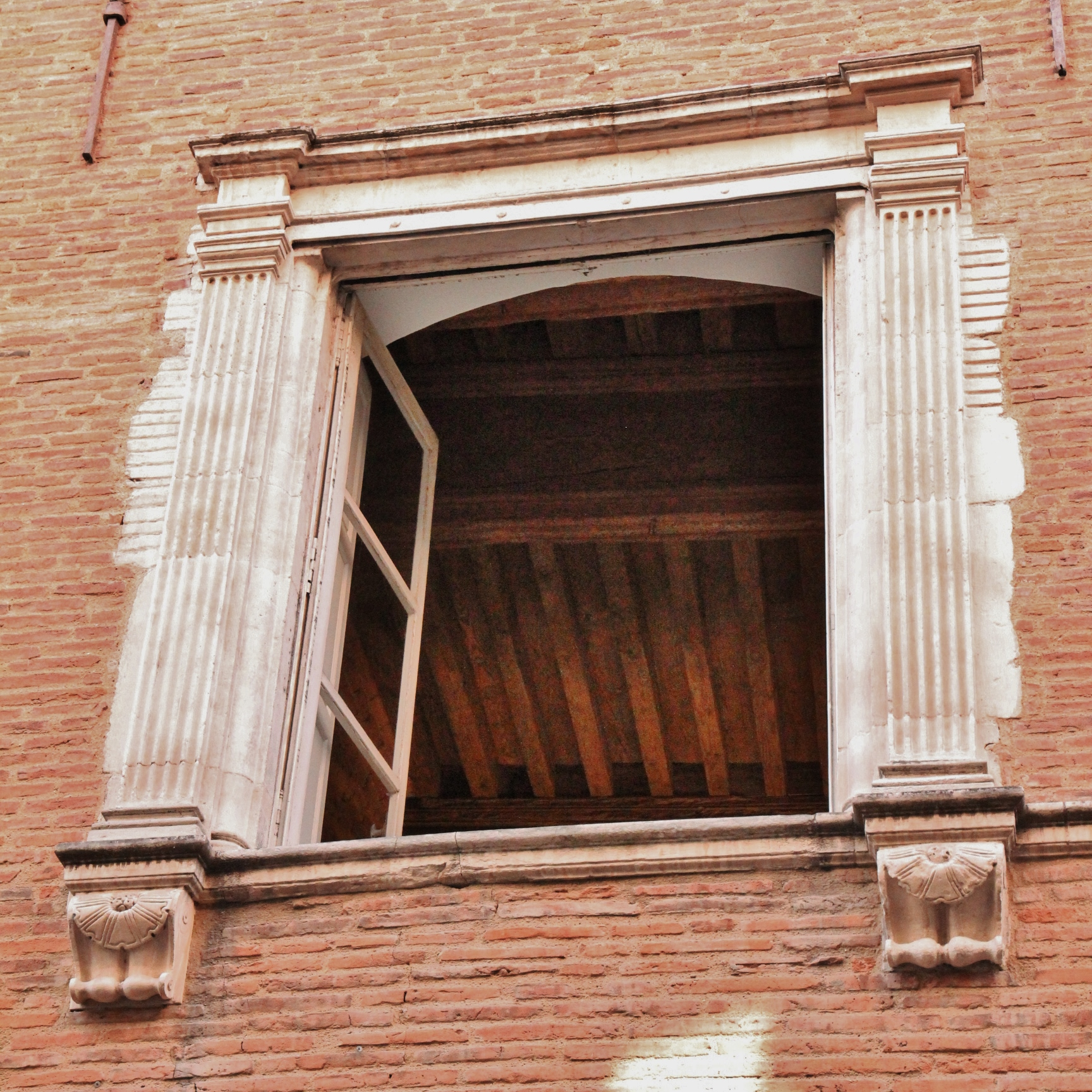
Renaissance window on street

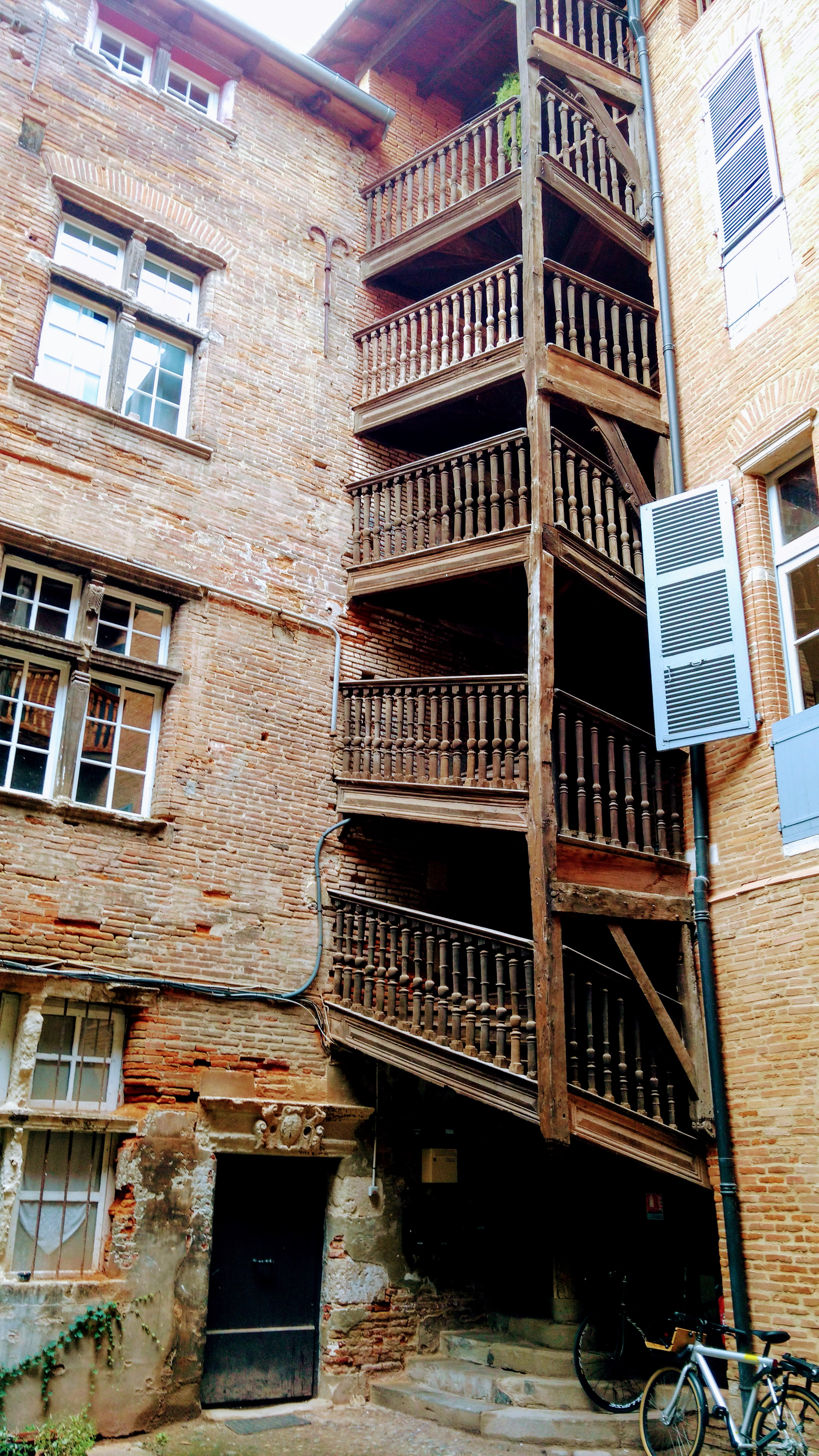
Suspended staircase

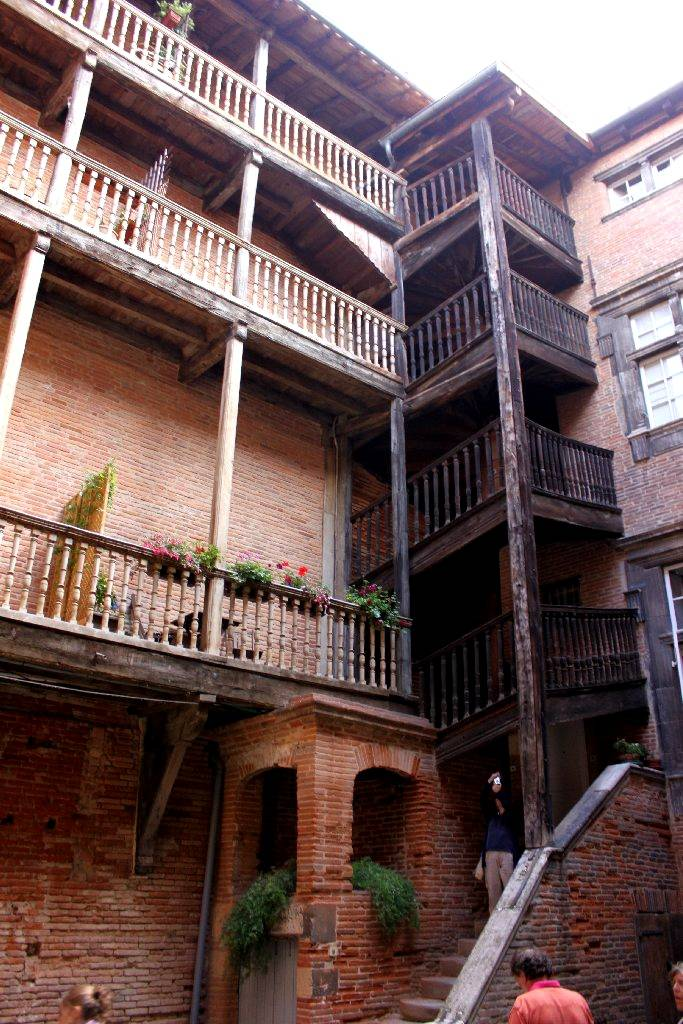
Wooden staircase and galleries

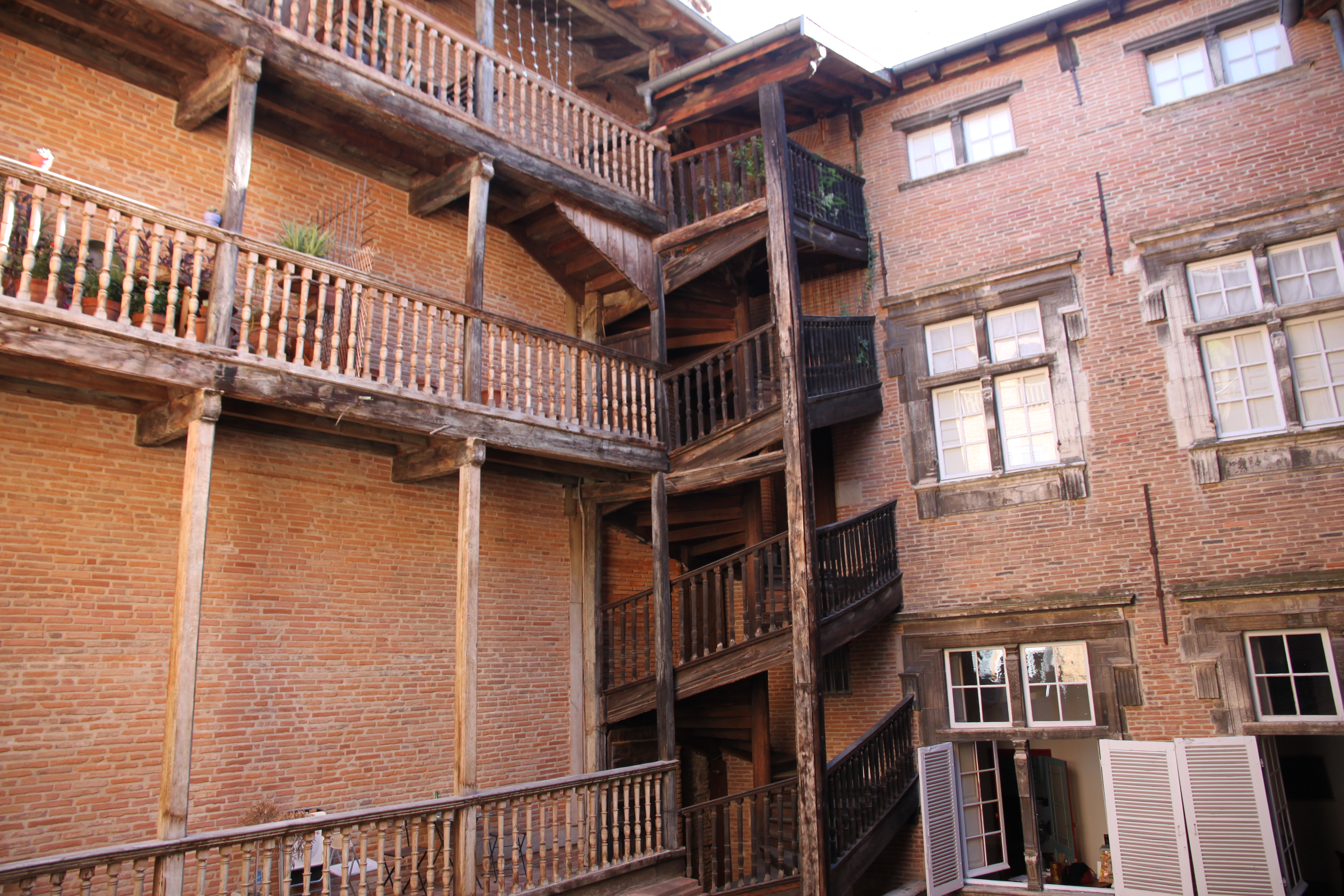

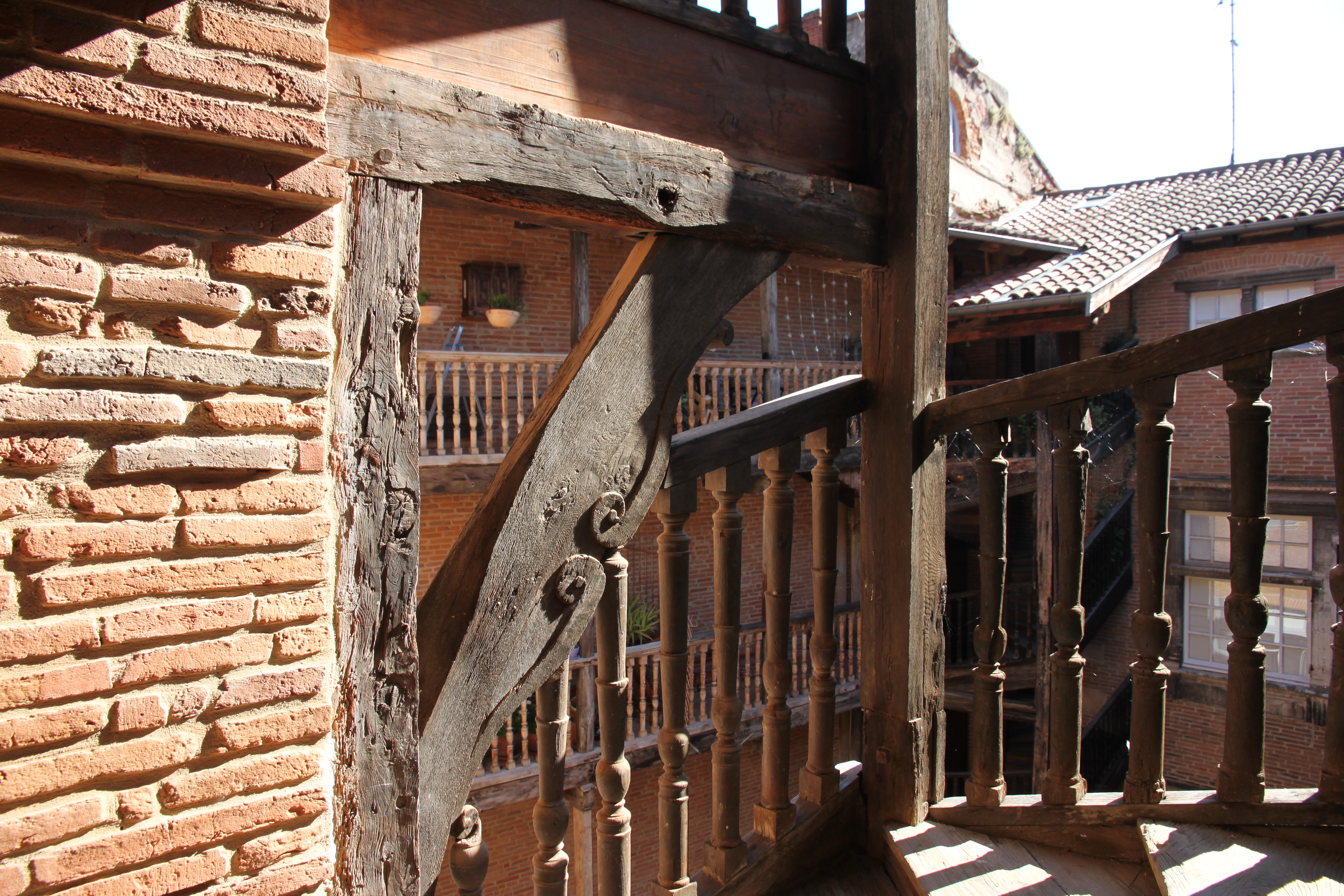
Moulded balusters and facing scrolls

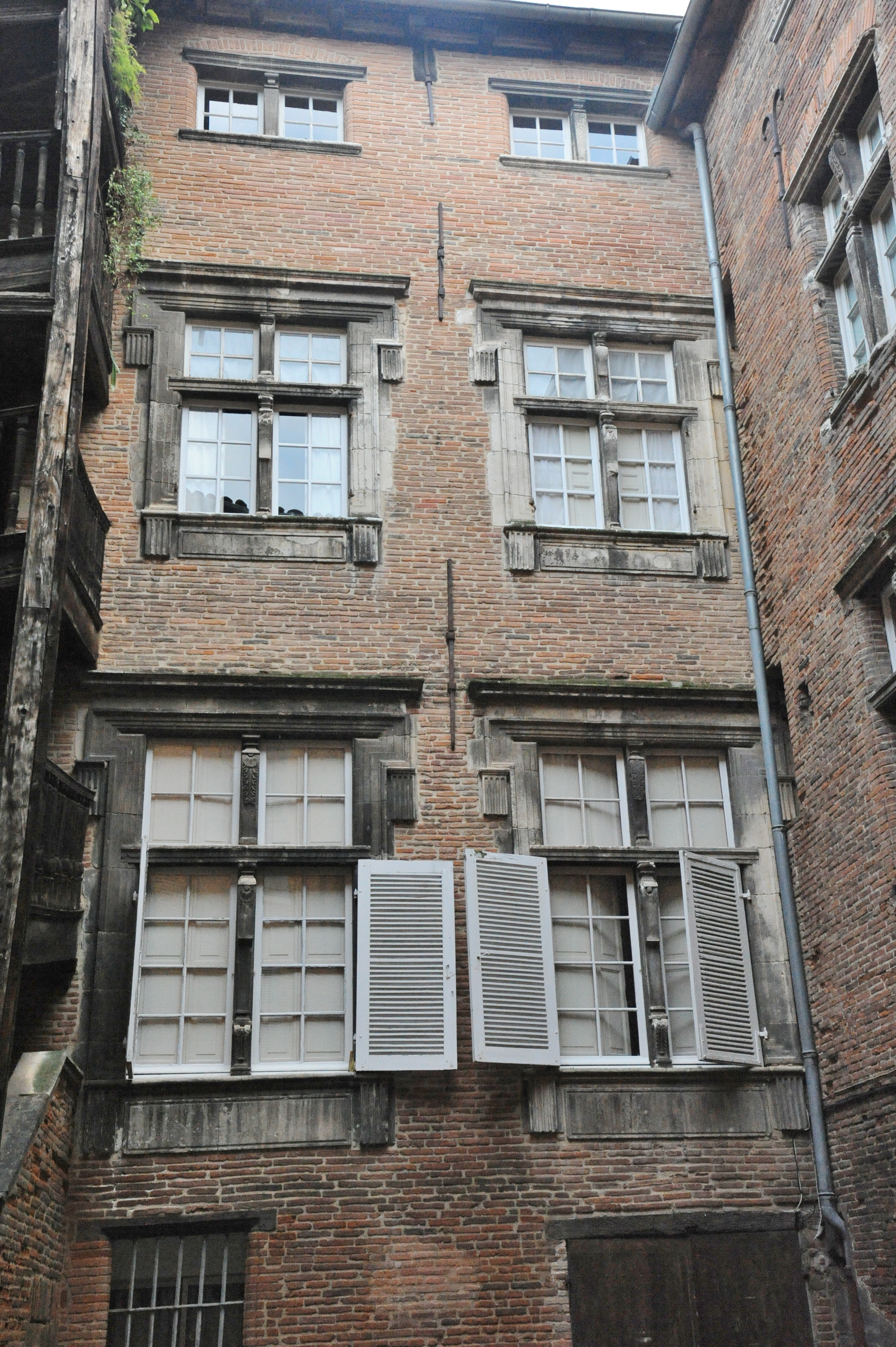
Façade overlooking the courtyard with Renaissance windows

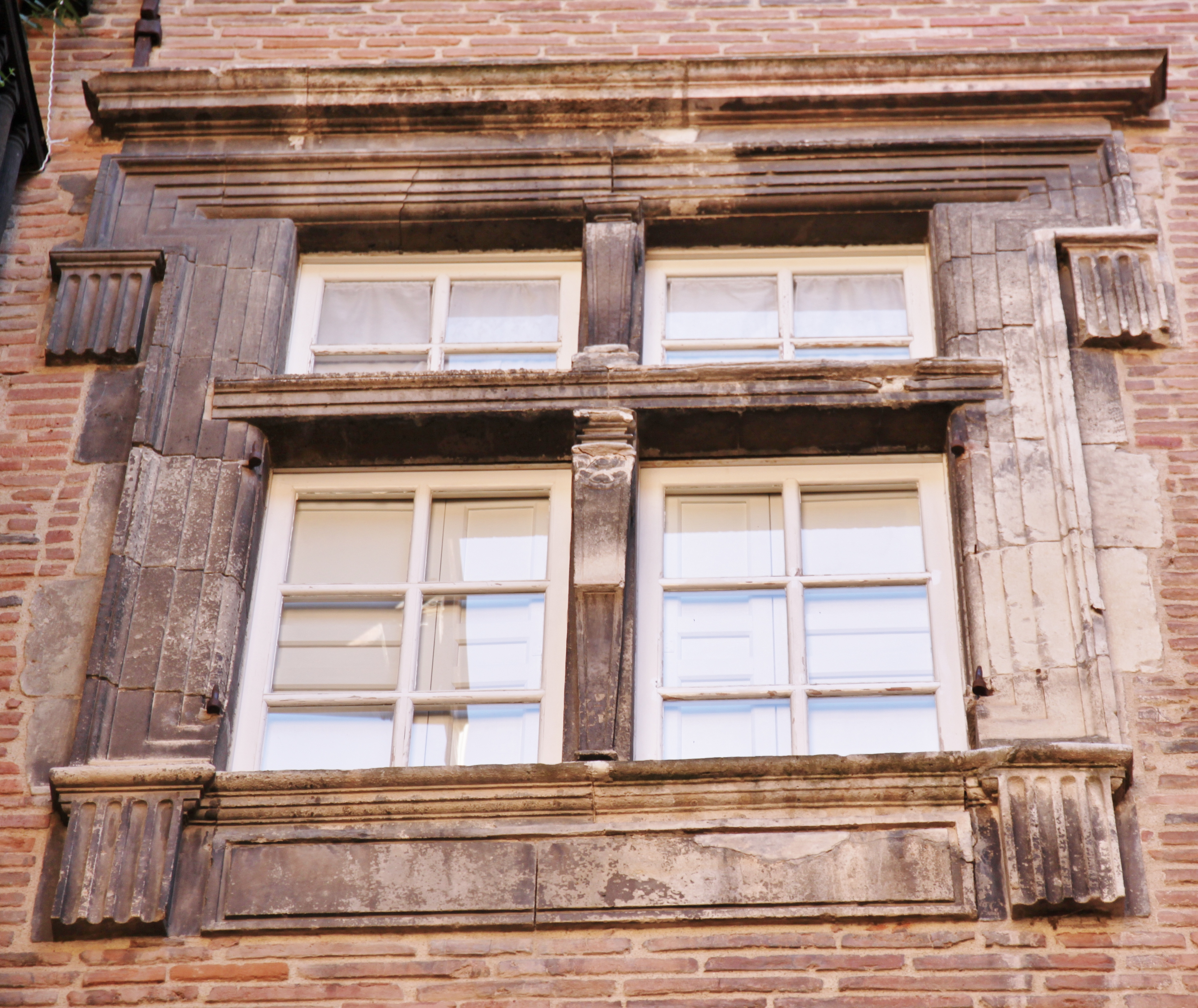
Window in the courtyard

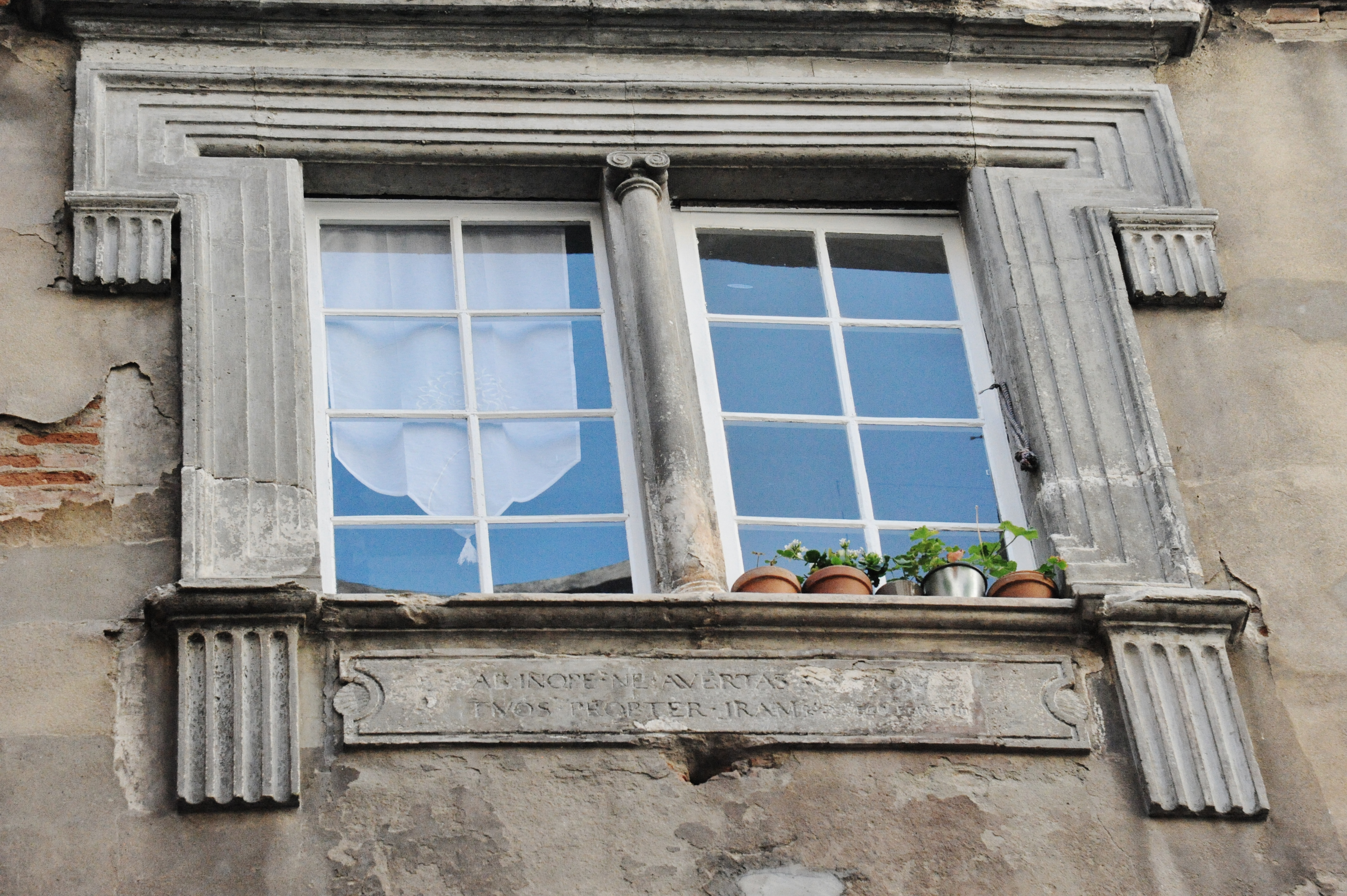
Neighbor's window copied by Jean Astorg (Hôtel Pierre Delpech)

== See also ==
- Renaissance architecture of Toulouse

== Bibliography ==
- Guy Ahlsell de Toulza, Louis Peyrusse, Bruno Tollon, Hôtels et Demeures de Toulouse et du Midi Toulousain, Daniel Briand éditeur, Drémil Lafage, 1997
