= Nicolas Joel =

French opera director (1953–2020)

- Born: 6 February 1953; Paris, France
- Died: 18 June 2020 (aged 67); Toulouse
- Other names: Nicolas Joël
- Occupations: Opera director; Opera manager
- Organizations: Capitole de Toulouse; Paris Opera
- Awards: Victoire de la Musique; Legion of Honour

Nicolas Joel or Joël (6 February 1953 – 18 June 2020) was a French opera director and administrator of opera houses. He was general manager of the Théâtre du Capitole de Toulouse from 1990 to 2009 and of the Paris Opera from 2009 to 2014. He directed operas internationally.

== Career ==
Joel was born in Paris, where he studied. In 1973, he was hired by the Opéra du Rhin in Strasbourg as assistant director and remained until 1978. In 1976, Patrice Chéreau brought him in as an assistant for the production of the Jahrhundertring for the centenary of the Bayreuth Festival. In 1979, he began his own directing career with a production of Wagner's Der Ring des Nibelungen for the Opéra du Rhin and the Opéra de Lyon. In 1981, he directed Samson et Dalila at the San Francisco Opera, with Shirley Verrett and Plácido Domingo in the leading roles, and Verdi's Aida at the Lyric Opera of Chicago, with Luciano Pavarotti.

He directed a second Ring for the Hessisches Staatstheater Wiesbaden, Aida at the Vienna State Opera in 1984, Verdi's Ernani and Wagner's Parsifal in San Francisco, Wagner's Lohengrin in Copenhagen, Tchaikovsky's Eugene Onegin, Mascagni's Cavalleria Rusticana and Leoncavallo's Pagliacci in Amsterdam and Gothenburg, Verdi's Rigoletto, La traviata and La forza del destino at the Opernhaus Zürich, Salomé by Richard Strauss in Essen, and Mussorgski's Boris Godunov and Bellini's I Capuleti e i Montecchi at the Theater Bremen. He also directed Puccini's Tosca in Lausanne for José van Dam's debut as Scarpia. In 1994, he made his debut at La Scala in Milan with Puccini's La rondine. He staged Gounod's Roméo et Juliette at the Royal Opera House in London, and Bizet's Carmen at the Teatro Colón in Buenos Aires.

Joel made his debut at the Metropolitan Opera in New York in 1996 with Giordano's Andrea Chénier, again with Pavarotti. In 1998, he directed Aida for the reopening of the Teatro Massimo of Palermo, and he staged Lucia di Lammermoor at the Metropolitan Opera. In 1999, he directed a new production of Massenet's Manon at La Scala.

In France, he directed Puccini's Turandot and Massenet's Thaïs in Nancy, Ponchielli's La Gioconda and Verdi's Les Vêpres siciliennes at the Opéra national de Montpellier, Debussy's La Damoiselle élue and Purcell's Dido and Aeneas with Jessye Norman at the Paris Opera, Gounod's Faust and the world premiere of Marcel Landowski's Montségur in Toulouse, and Andrea Chénier at the Opéra du Rhin and the Opéra de Lyon. At the Paris Opera, he staged a new production of Un Bal masqué in 1992. He directed Wagner's Parsifal in Nice in 1994.

From 1990 to 2009, Joel was artistic director of the Capitole de Toulouse. For the reopening of the Théâtre du Capitole in 1996, he presented Charpentier's Louise and Massenet's Werther. Among his productions in Toulouse were Wagner's Ring, Boris Godunov, Louise and Hamlet. He reopened the Théâtre du Capitole, after the renovation of the stage cage, in October 2004, with a new production of Janáček's Jenůfa.

He staged Daphne by Richard Strauss at the Vienna State Opera in 2004, Puccini's La rondine at the Metropolitan Opera in 2008, and Faust at the Vienna State Opera the same year.

=== Paris Opera ===
From 2009, Joel was director of the Paris Opera, succeeding Gerard Mortier.

In 2011, the institution recorded an attendance of nearly 800,000, 94.1% and 1.7% higher than in 2010. While standard repertoire was performed, contemporary opera appeared in Bruno Mantovani's opera Akhmatova, Jean-Guillaume Bart's ballet La Source, Alexei Ratmansky's ballet Psyché, which was also shown in New York City, and Wayne McGregor's ballet L'Anatomie de la sensation.

In October 2012, Joel announced that he would not stand for another term, after learning of the Opera's budgetary planning for the coming years. In September 2013, he tendered his resignation, one year early, effective August 2014. He was succeeded by Stéphane Lissner.

== Family ==
Joel was the brother of conductor Emmanuel Joel-Hornak. He died on 18 June 2020 in Toulouse.

== Awards ==
Joel received the Drama and Music Critics Award for his lyrical productions twice, as well as a Victoire de la Musique in 1996, in the category "Best Lyrical Production" for Poulenc's Dialogues des Carmélites.

Joel had been a chevalier (knight) of the Legion of Honour since 2004 and became an officer in 2014.

Preceded by Gérard Mortier	Director of the Paris Opera; 2009–2014	Succeeded by Stéphane Lissner
