= Théâtre du Capitole =

Opera house in Toulouse, France

Coordinates: 43°36′15″N 1°26′40″E

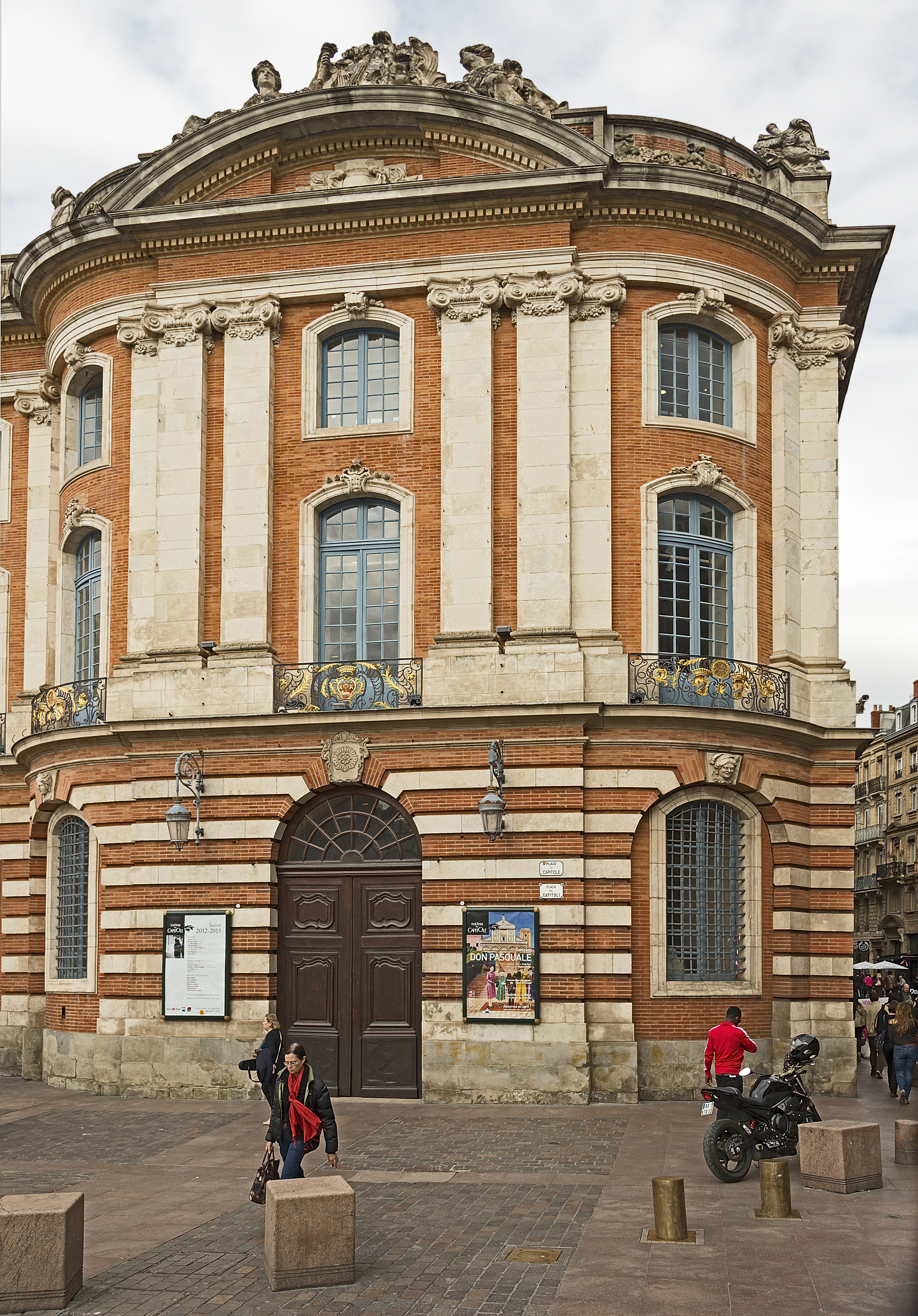
Théâtre du Capitole, main entrance.

The Théâtre du Capitole de Toulouse is an opera house within the main administration buildings, the Capitole, of the city of Toulouse in south-west France. It houses an opera company, ballet company and symphony orchestra, Orchestre national du Capitole de Toulouse.

The first performance space, a salle du jeu de spectacle, was created to a design by Guillaume Cammas in 1736. Following a period of neglect, the current space was created during the rebuild of 1818. The theatre suffered fire damage in 1917 but was restored in 1923. The front of house areas were modernised in 1996. The current capacity is 1156 seats.

Michel Plasson was responsible for the artistic direction of the company from 1973. He was followed by Jacques Doucet in 1981, by Nicolas Joel in 1991, and by Frédéric Chambert in 2009, after Joel's move to the Opéra national de Paris. Chambert's first season was marked by the use of alternate spaces while the theatre was renovated, and the theatre was re-opened for the beginning of the 2010–11 season.

The opera company is a member of the Réunion des Opéras de France.
