= Stéphane Lissner =

French writer

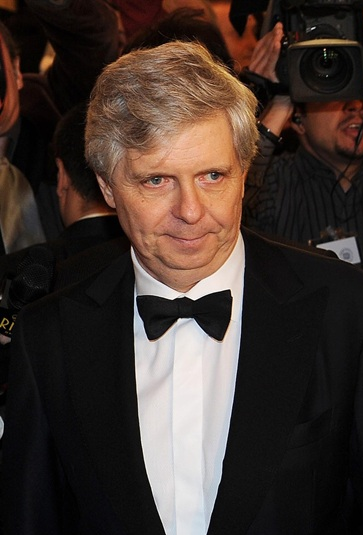
Stéphane Lissner

Stéphane Lissner (born 23 January 1953) is a French theatre director. He was the artistic director of the Teatro alla Scala in Milan, Italy, from 2005 to 2014 and the director of the Paris Opera from 2014 to 2020.

== Life ==
Born in the 12th arrondissement of Paris, son of a company manager, Lissner is a student at the Collège Stanislas and the lycée Henri-IV. Just graduating from college, he created the "Théâtre mécanique" in 1972 in a small venue in the 7th arrondissement of Paris. He directed it until 1975. He began his career in the public theatre industry as Secretary General of the Théâtre de la Commune of Aubervilliers in 1977, then codirected the Nouveau théâtre de Nice from 1978 to 1983.

He then directed the "Printemps du théâtre" between 1984 and 1987, taught the management of cultural institutions at the Université Paris-Dauphine in 1984, and was appointed Director General of the Théâtre du Châtelet in Paris in 1988, while he has been a member of the Board of Directors since 1983. He remained so until 1997 while assuming the general management of the Orchestre de Paris from 1994 to 1996.

The direction of the Aix-en-Provence Festival was entrusted to him in 1998. He also headed the Théâtre des Bouffes du Nord with Peter Brook from 1998 to June 2005, and has been directing with Frédéric Franck the Théâtre de la Madeleine since 2002.

As he was to retain the management of the Aix Festival until 2009, he had to leave it in 2006 to fully assume the positions of Superintendent and Artistic Director of the Teatro alla Scala in Milan, to which he was appointed in April 2005 and reappointed in November 2009.

In October 2012, he was appointed Deputy Director of the Paris Opera and was appointed to succeed the then Director Nicolas Joel at the end of his term in summer 2015. Finally, Nicolas Joël advanced the end of his term of office to August 1, 2014 and, on July 9, 2014, Lissner was officially appointed Director of the Paris Opera.

With effect from 1 June 2023, the date of entry into force of the decree, the Superintendent Stéphane Lissner has ceased to hold office at the Teatro di San Carlo of Naples following the urgent legislative interventions, adopted at the meeting of the Council of Ministers of the Italian Republic dated 4 May 2023 concerning the reform of governance including lyric-symphonic foundations which provides for the prohibition of receiving assignments, positions and collaborations for those who have completed the 70th year of age.

== Controversies ==
In February 2015, during an interview in the program "Qui êtes-vous ?" on BFM Business, Lissner was subjected by the journalist to an audio quiz on opera but only recognized one extract from the five classics chosen (La Wally, La forza del destino, Carmen, Tosca and Madama Butterfly, attracting the mockery of many Internet users relayed by the press.

In May 2018, Lissner supports his Director of Dance, Aurélie Dupont following the disclosure by the press of an internal investigation pointing out the mistrust of a majority of dancers towards their management.

== Awards ==
- Officier of the Légion d'honneur since 2017.

== Publications ==
- Métro Chapelle, NiL Éditions, Paris 2000, ISBN 2-84111-187-3.

Preceded by Jean-Albert Cartier	director of the Théâtre du Châtelet; 1998-2006	Succeeded by Jean-Pierre Brossmann
Preceded by Louis Erlo	director of the Aix-en-Provence Festival; 1998-2006	Succeeded by Bernard Foccroulle
Preceded by Nicolas Joel	director of the Paris Opera; 2014-2020	Succeeded by Alexander Neef
