= Théâtre de la Madeleine =

Theatre in Paris, France

- Exterior of the Théâtre de la Madeleine in 2025
- Interactive map of Théâtre de la Madeleine
- Address: 19 rue de Surène; 8th. Paris; Paris
- Coordinates: 48.8710°N 2.3205°E
- Capacity: 709

Construction
- Opened: 1924
- Architect: Charles Imandt

Website
- www.theatremadeleine.com

The Théâtre de la Madeleine (French pronunciation: [teɑtʁ də la madlɛn]) is a performance venue in Paris built in the English style in 1924 on the site of a carousel. It can accommodate around 700 people. The first major success of the theatre came with the presentation of part one of The Merchants of Glory by Marcel Pagnol.

It was closely associated with the French stage actor, film actor, director, screenwriter, and prolific playwright Sacha Guitry who composed 24 of his plays here between 1932 and 1940.

Simone Valere and Jean Desailly were directors of the theater from 1980 until 2002. In 2003 the director's job was taken over by Frederick Frank (until 2012) and Stéphane Lissner (until 2005). Since 2012, Jean-Claude Camus has been director.
