= Guillaume Cammas =

French painter and architect

- Born: 1688; Aignes, Gascony, France
- Died: 1777 (aged 88–89)
- Occupations: Painter & architect
- Children: François Cammas

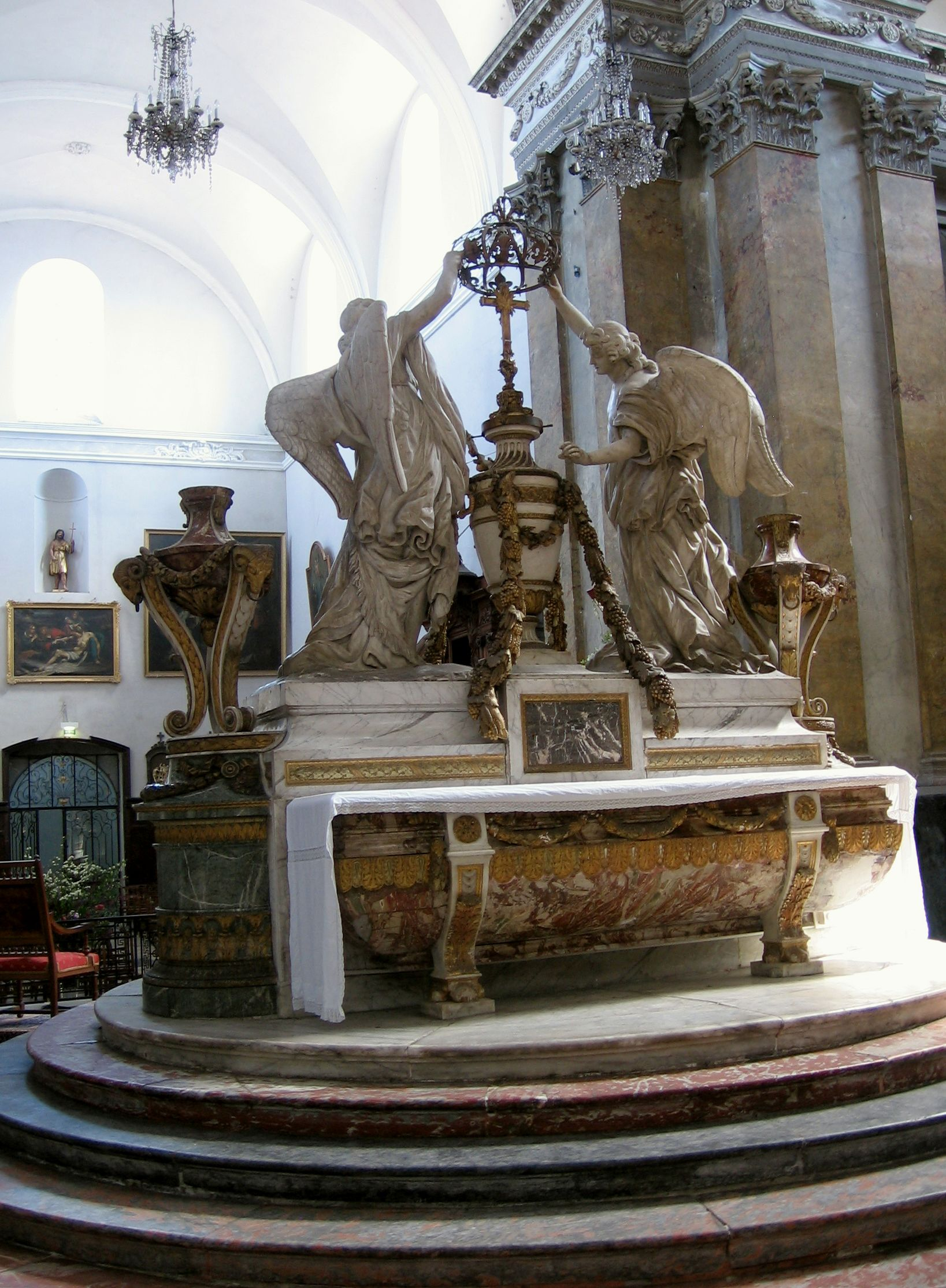
High altar of Saint Peter of the Carthusian monastery in Toulouse – designed by Guillaume Cammas

Guillaume Cammas (1688–1777) was a French painter and architect.

== Life ==
Cammas was born in Aignes, Gascony, France. He studied under the painter Antoine Rivalz, and designed the façade of the Capitole de Toulouse, built between 1750 and 1759. He was one of the founders of Académie royale de peinture de Toulouse, where he taught. His son François Cammas designed the transept of the église Saint-Pierre des Chartreux de Toulouse.
