= Capitole de Toulouse =

Centre of municipal administration of Toulouse, France

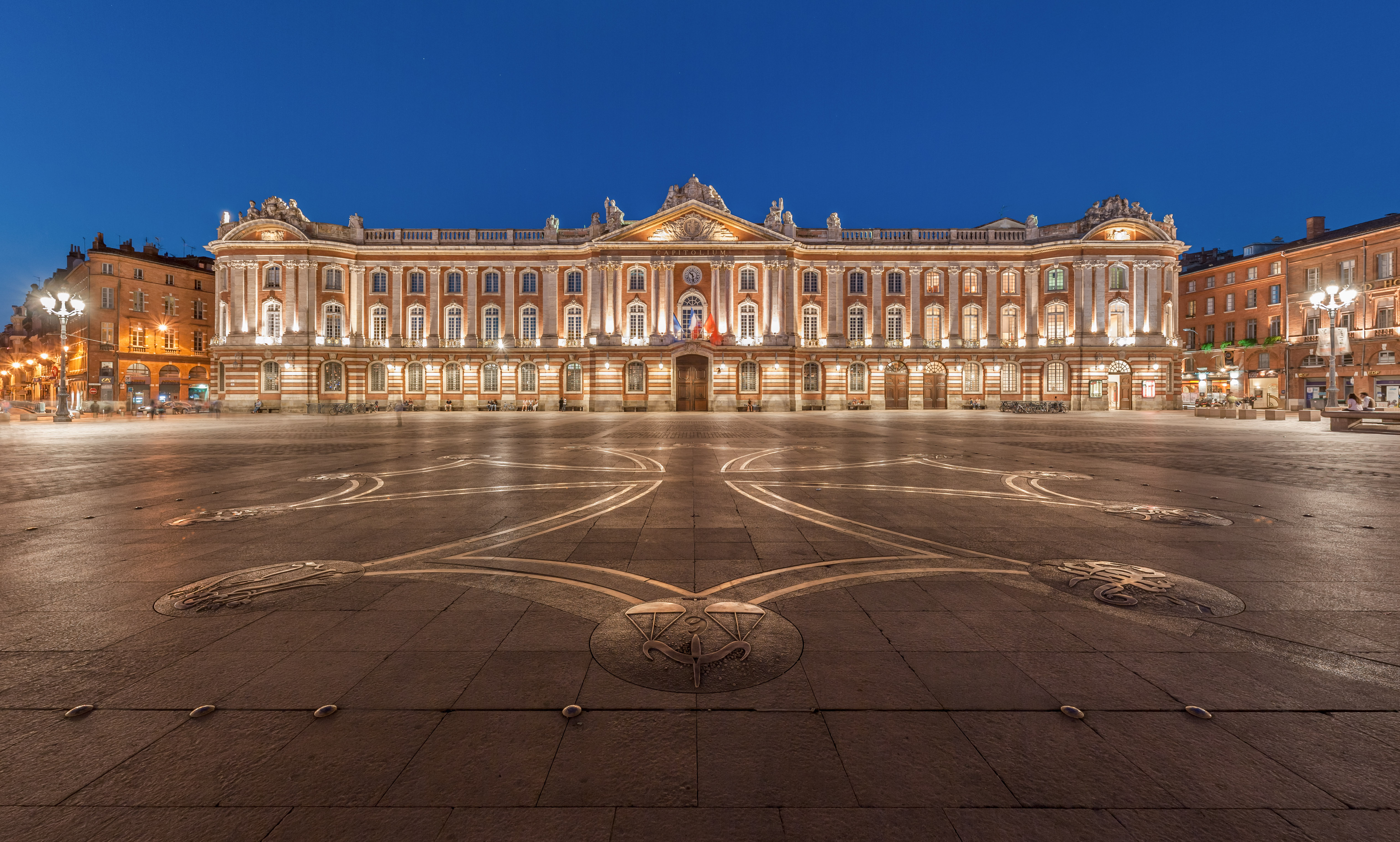
- Main frontage of the Capitole de Toulouse in June 2009

General information
- Type: City hall
- Architectural style: Neoclassical style
- Location: Toulouse, France
- Coordinates: 43.6045°N 1.4440°E
- Completed: 1760

Design and construction
- Architect: Guillaume Cammas

Monument historique
- Official name: Hôtel de ville appelé Le Capitole
- Type: Inscrit
- Designated: 1840
- Reference no.: PA00094497

The Capitole de Toulouse (Occitan: Capitòli de Tolosa; lit. 'Capitol of Toulouse'), commonly known as the Capitole, is the heart of the municipal administration and the city hall of the French city of Toulouse. It was designated a monument historique by the French government in 1840.

== History ==
=== Early history of the site ===
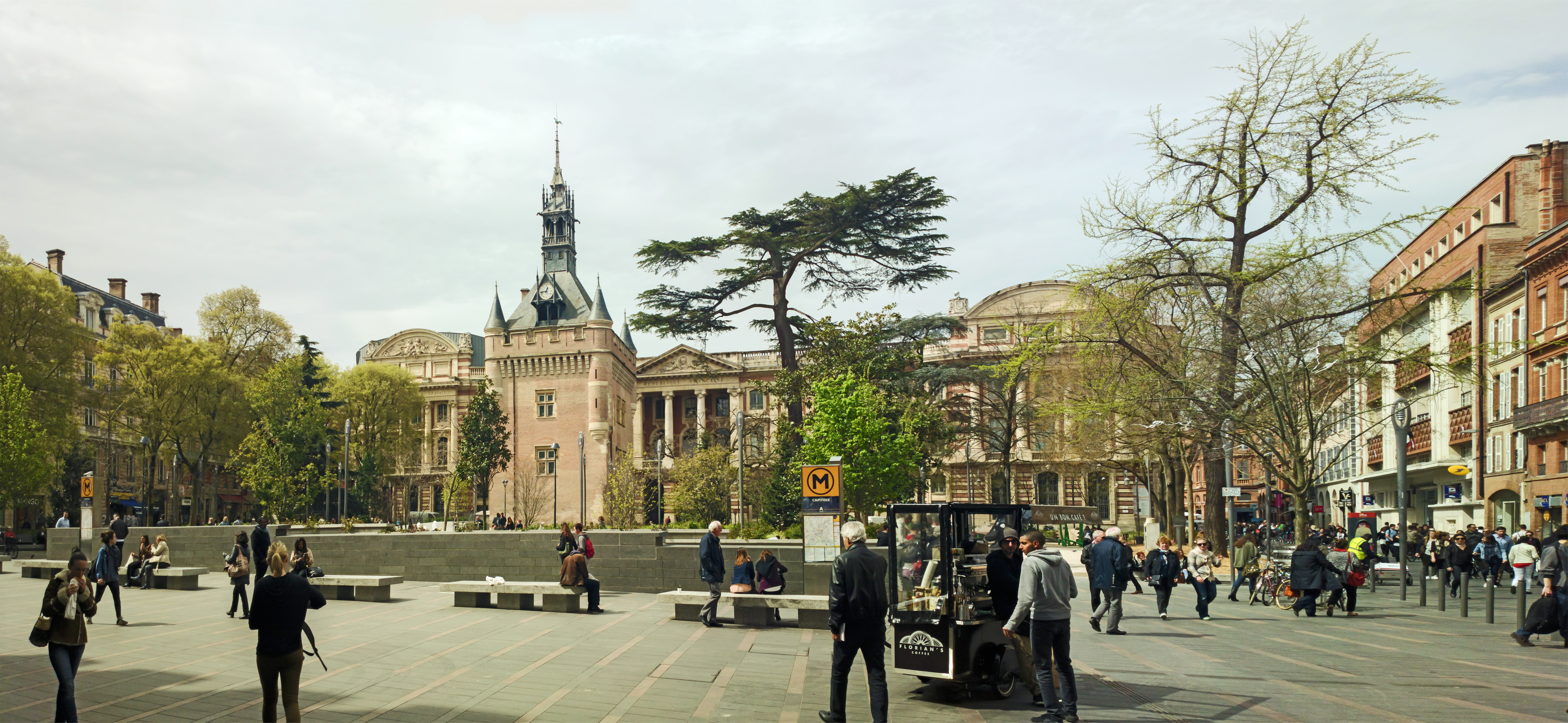
Capitole de Toulouse, rear elevation with le donjon in the foreground

In 1190, the Capitouls (governing magistrates) of Toulouse commissioned the original structures on the site to provide a seat for the government of a province which was growing in wealth and influence. The site was named the Capitole by the town clerk, Pierre Salmon, in 1522 to recall the Roman Capitol. A dungeon tower, known as le donjon, was completed in 1530 and a renaissance style gateway, designed by Nicolas Bachelier, providing access to the Henri IV courtyard, was completed in 1546.

Only the Henri IV courtyard and the gateway survive from the original medieval buildings. Le donjon was fought over during the 1562 Riots of Toulouse, with Huguenot forces holding it with captured cannons. It was in the Henri IV courtyard that Henri de Montmorency, 4th Duke of Montmorency was decapitated after his rebellion against Cardinal Richelieu in 1632. The Salle du jeu de Spectacle (the room for shows), from which the Théâtre du Capitole Opera Company and the Orchestre national du Capitole de Toulouse later emerged, was created in 1737.

=== The new building ===
In the mid-18th century, the capitouls decided to commission a municipal palace which would be unique in France. The site they chose was to the immediate west of le donjon and the site enclosed the Henri IV courtyard. The new building, which was 135 meters (443 ft) long, was designed by Guillaume Cammas in the neoclassical style, built in characteristic pink brick and was completed in 1760.

The design involved a central section of the three bays, which was slightly projected forward, wings of six bays on either side, and a pair of end bays, which were projected forward as pavilions. The central section featured a segmental headed doorway with a keystone flanked by a pair of segmental headed windows on the ground floor, a French door flanked by a pair of tall segmental headed windows on the first floor, and a clock flanked by a pair of shorter segmental headed windows on the second floor. The bays in the central section were flanked by eight Corinthian order columns supporting an entablature and a pediment. The wings and end bays were fenestrated in a similar style and flanked by Corinthian order pilasters. The eight columns in the central section were intended to recall the original eight capitouls. Internally, the principal rooms included Le Grand Consistoire, Le Petit Consistoire, L'Arsenal and Le Salle des Illustres. These rooms exhibited some fine paintings, some of which were destroyed during the French Revolution.

Le donjon was the venue for a religiously-biased trial during which a protestant, Jean Calas, was interrogated and broken on the wheel in 1762.

On 24 March 1871, inspired by the establishment of the Paris Commune, a crowd of revolutionary guardsmen stormed the Capitole, seeking the establishment of a similar commune in Toulouse. However, the insurrection only lasted a few days and on 27 March 1871, the revolutionaries left the building peacefully. Le donjon was rebuilt to a design by Eugène Viollet-le-Duc in a style typical of northern France in 1873.

Following the liberation of Toulouse on 19 August 1944, during the Second World War, the Capitole was draped in French tricolour flags. On 19 February 1967, the president of France, Charles de Gaulle, visited the town and delivered a speech from the balcony of the building.

== Gallery ==
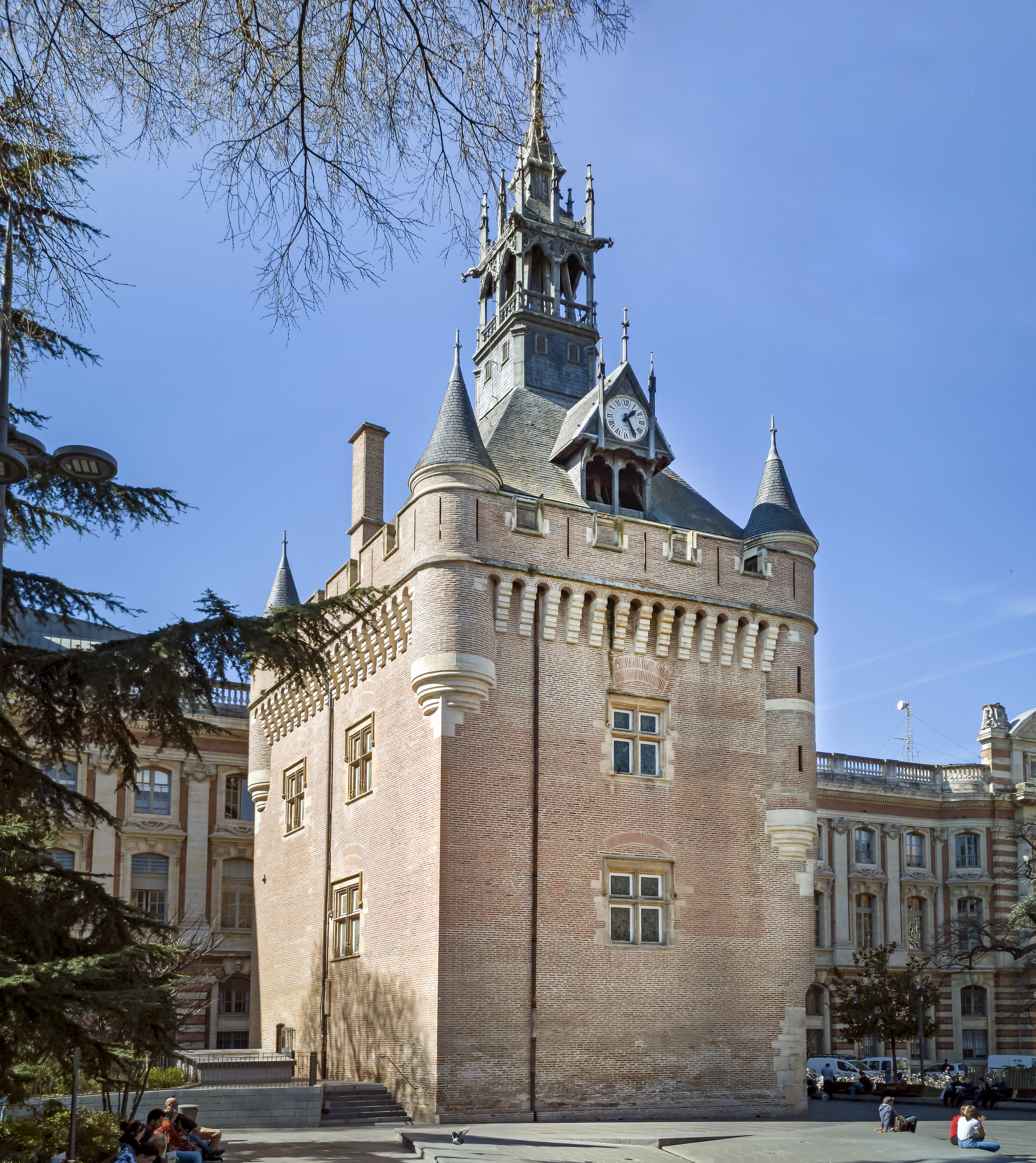
The capitouls' former tower, le donjon, (1525-1530, except for the top)

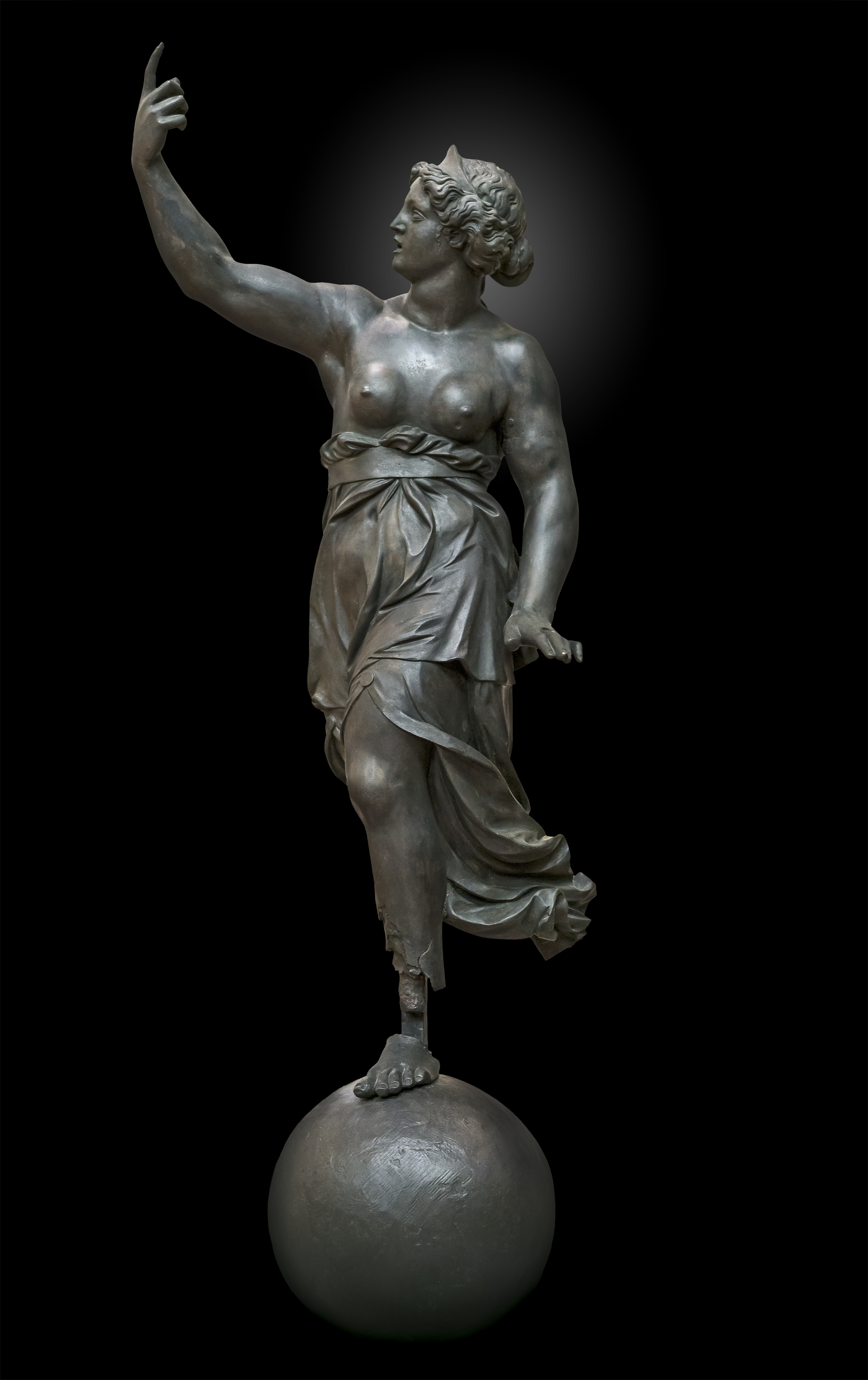
Jean Rancy's Lady Tholose, 1544–1550, that served as a weather vane on the tower

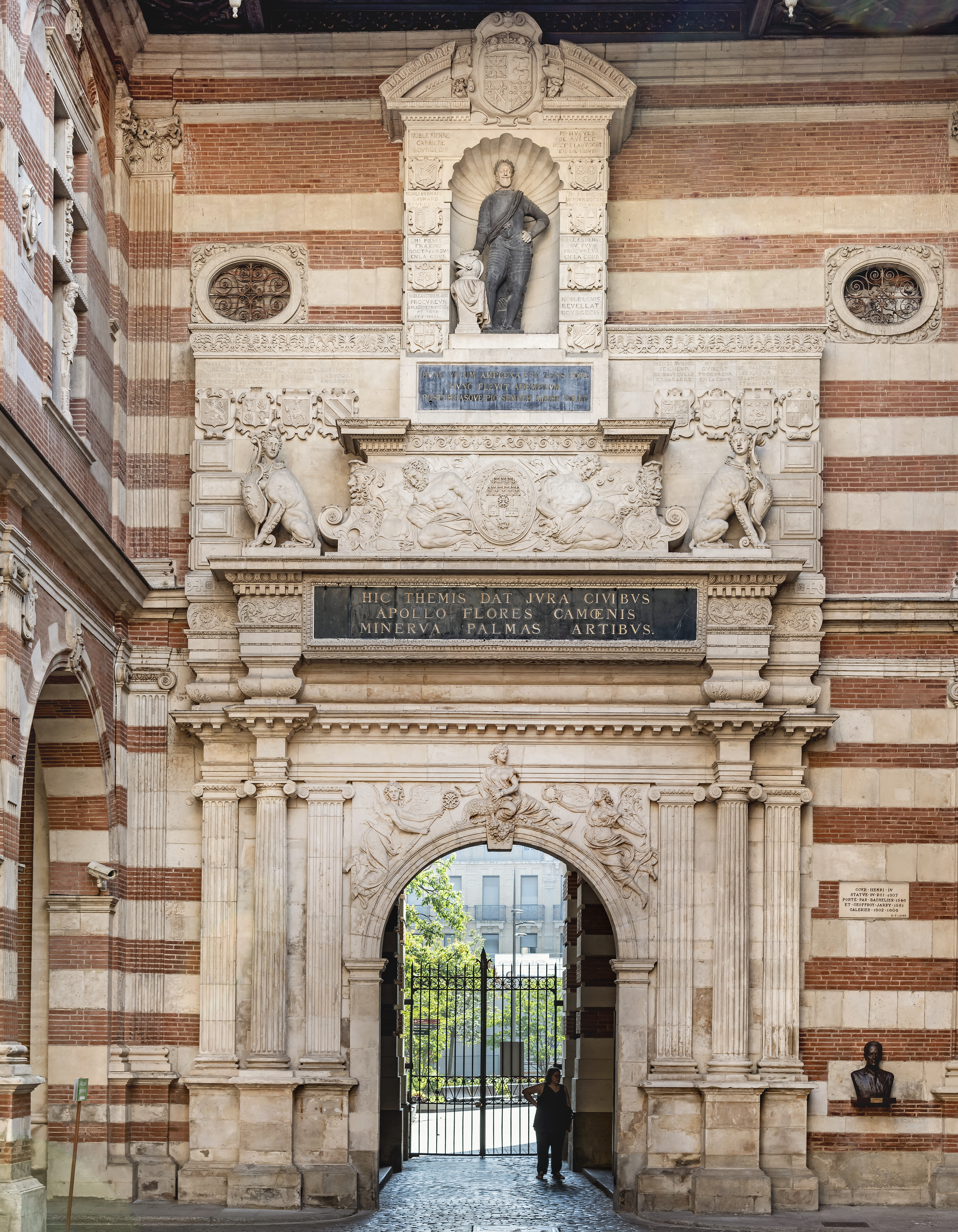
The Renaissance portal in the courtyard (16th and 17th c.)

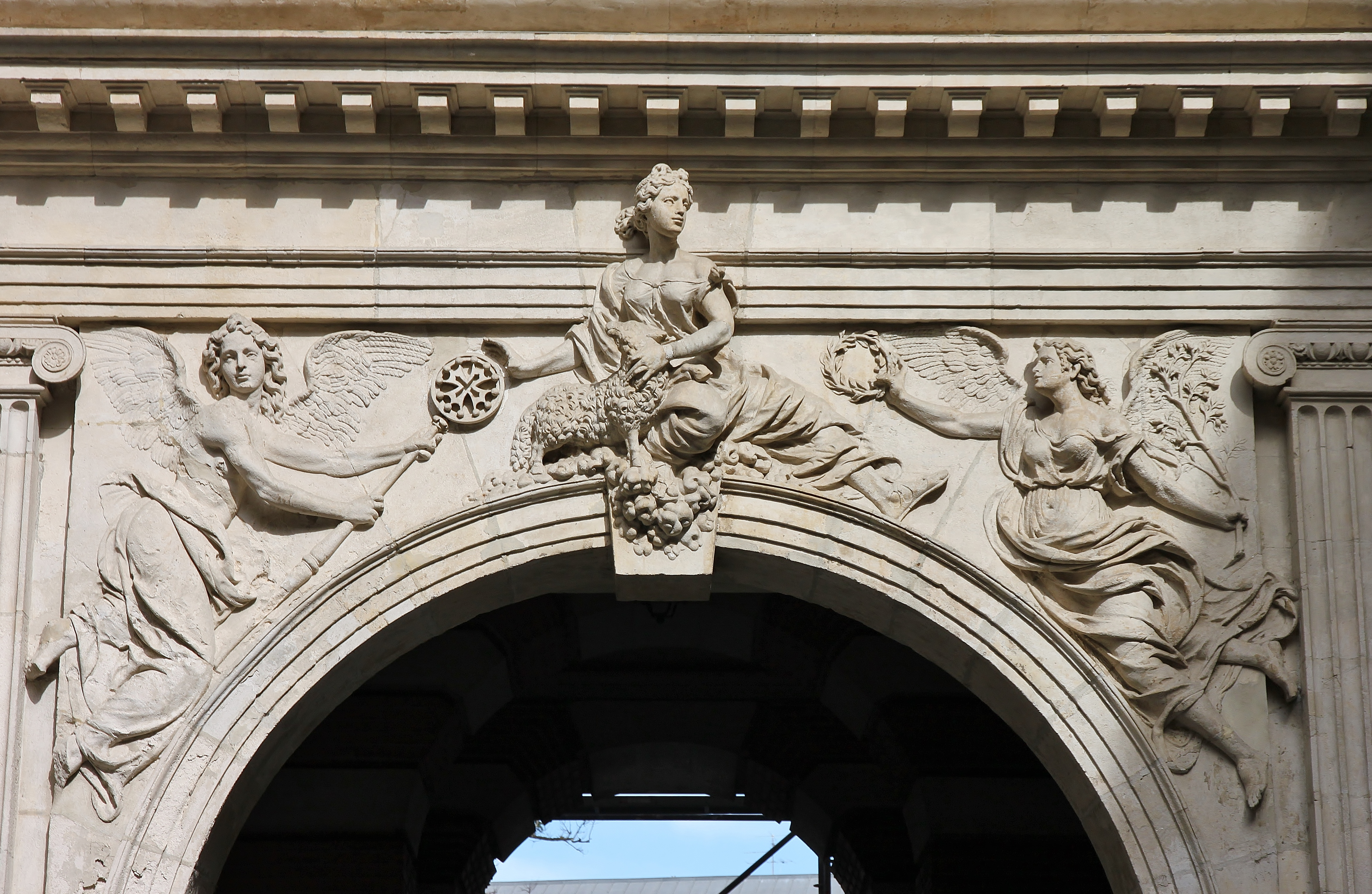
The lower part of the portal (1546) represents Pallas, protector of the city since Roman times

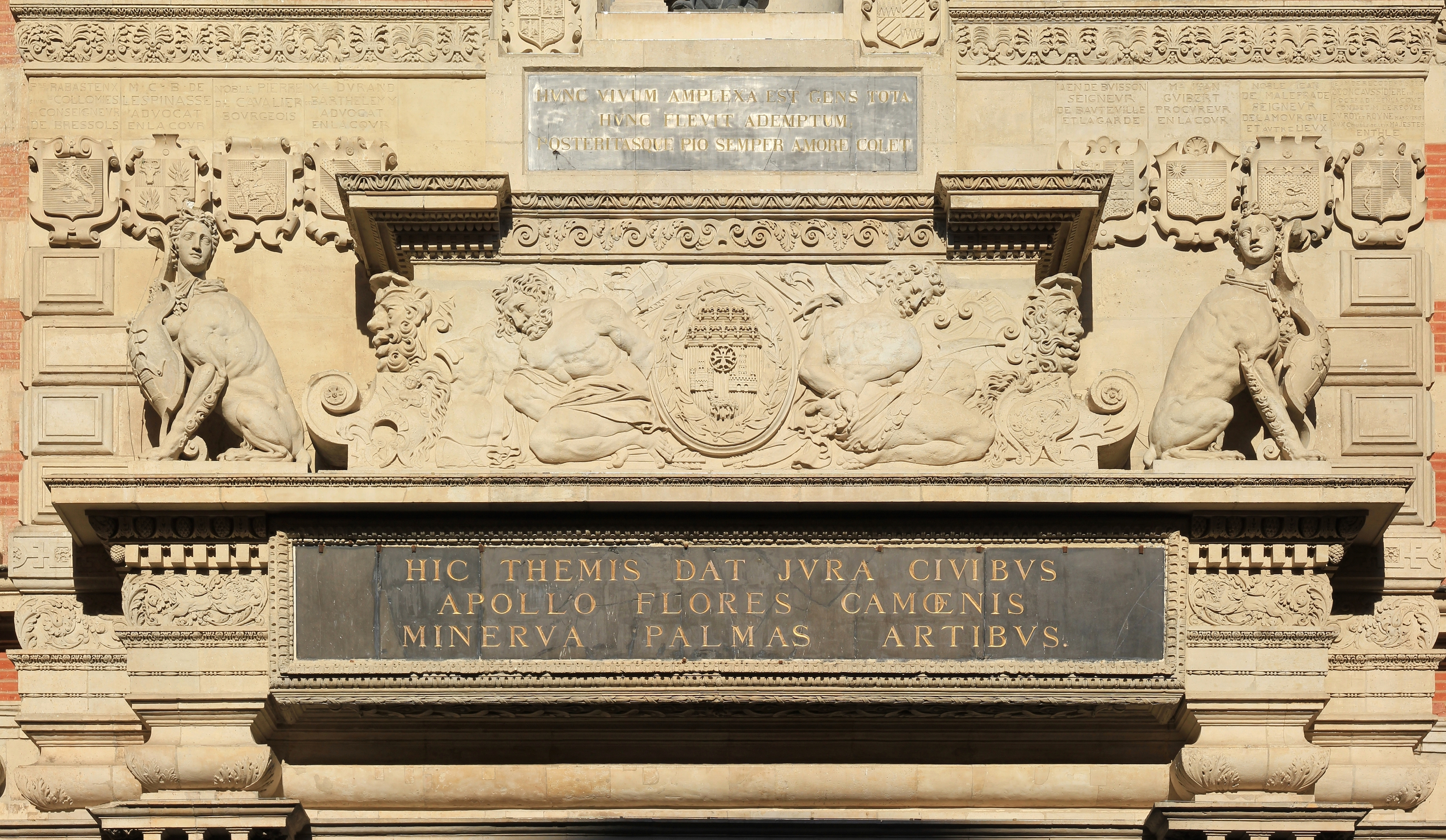
The middle part of the portal (1561) depicts enslaved prisoners

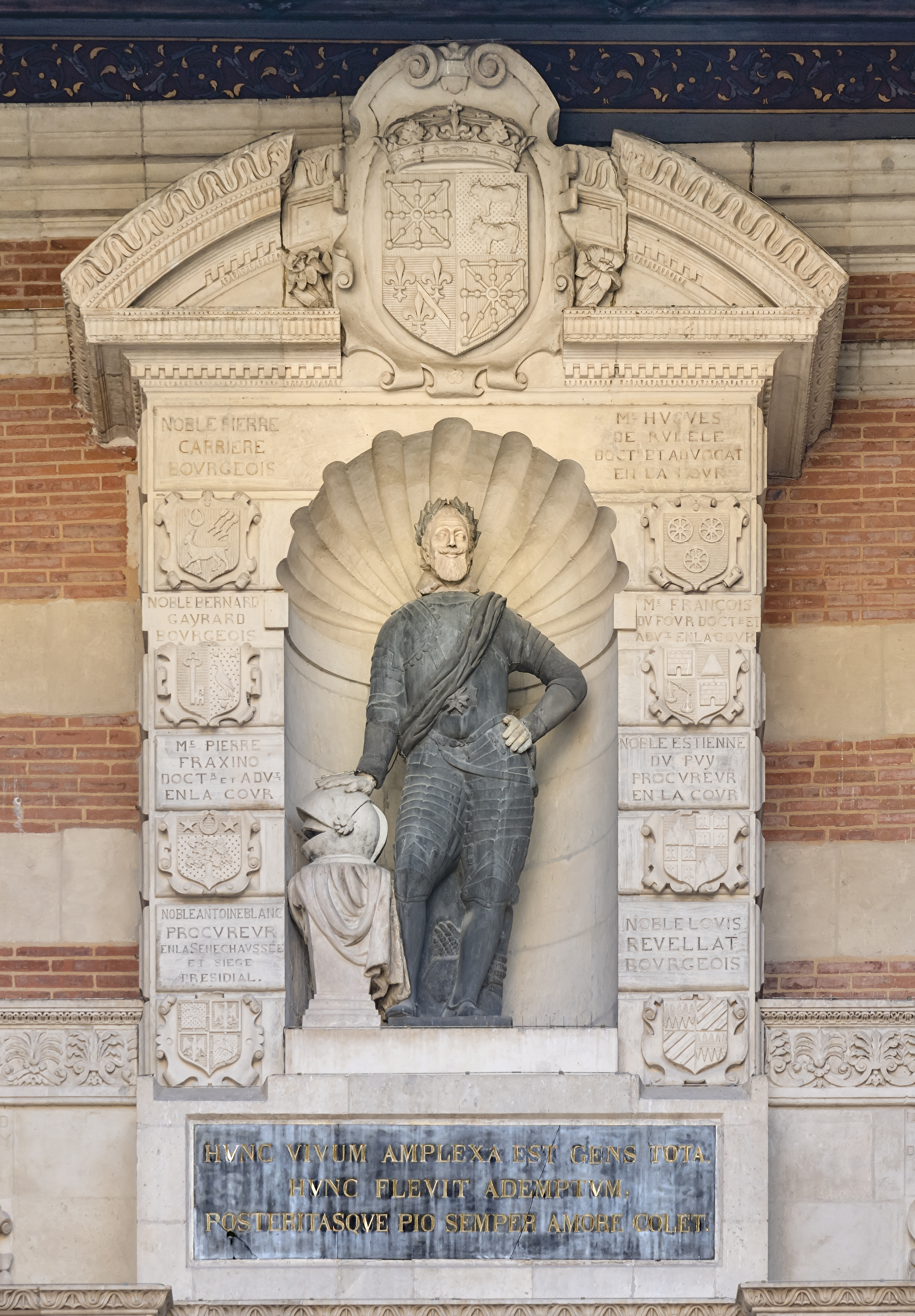
The upper part of the portal (1602-1609) features a statue of King Henry IV

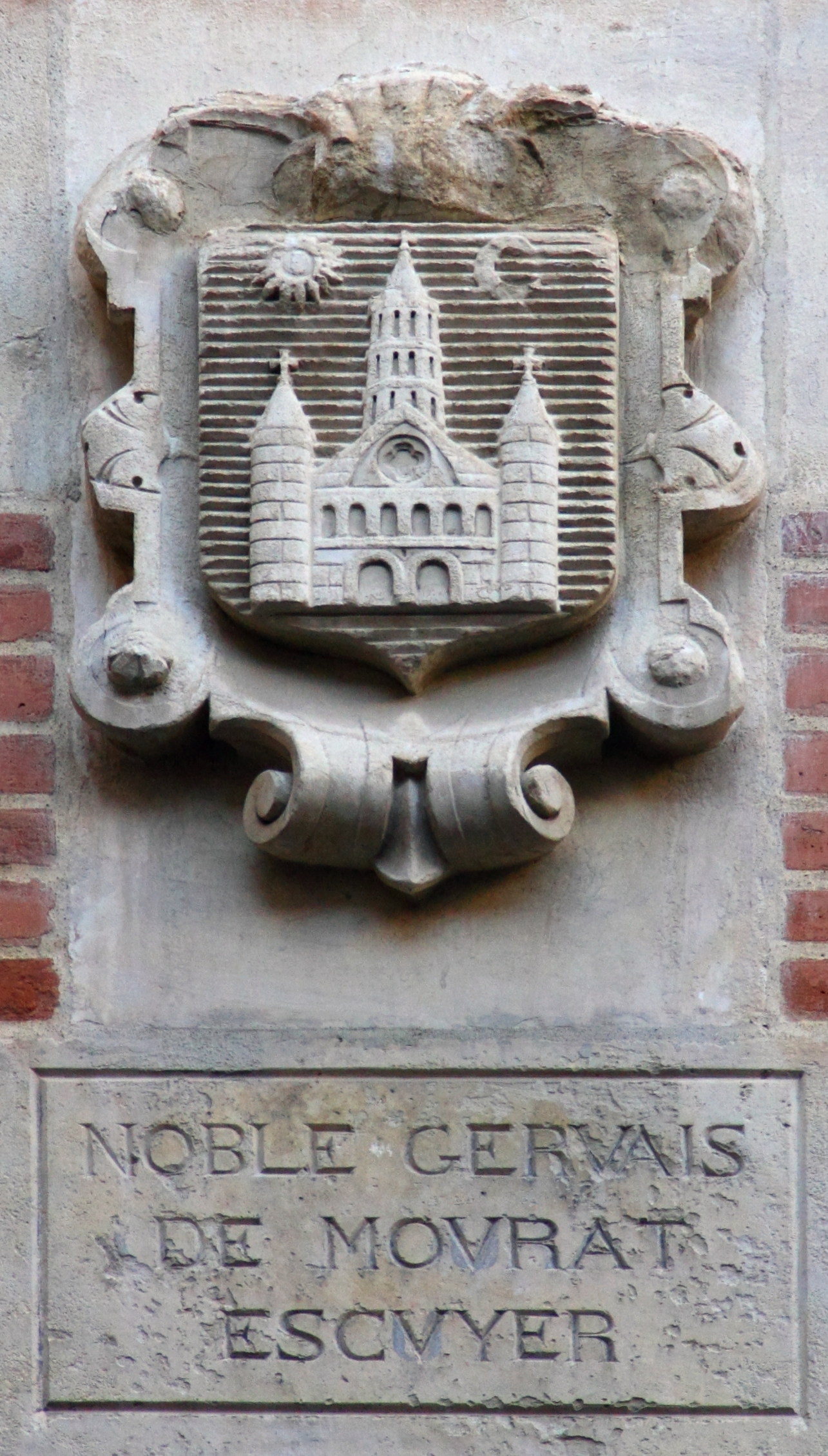
The inner courtyard (1602-1606) is decorated with many coats of arms of capitouls

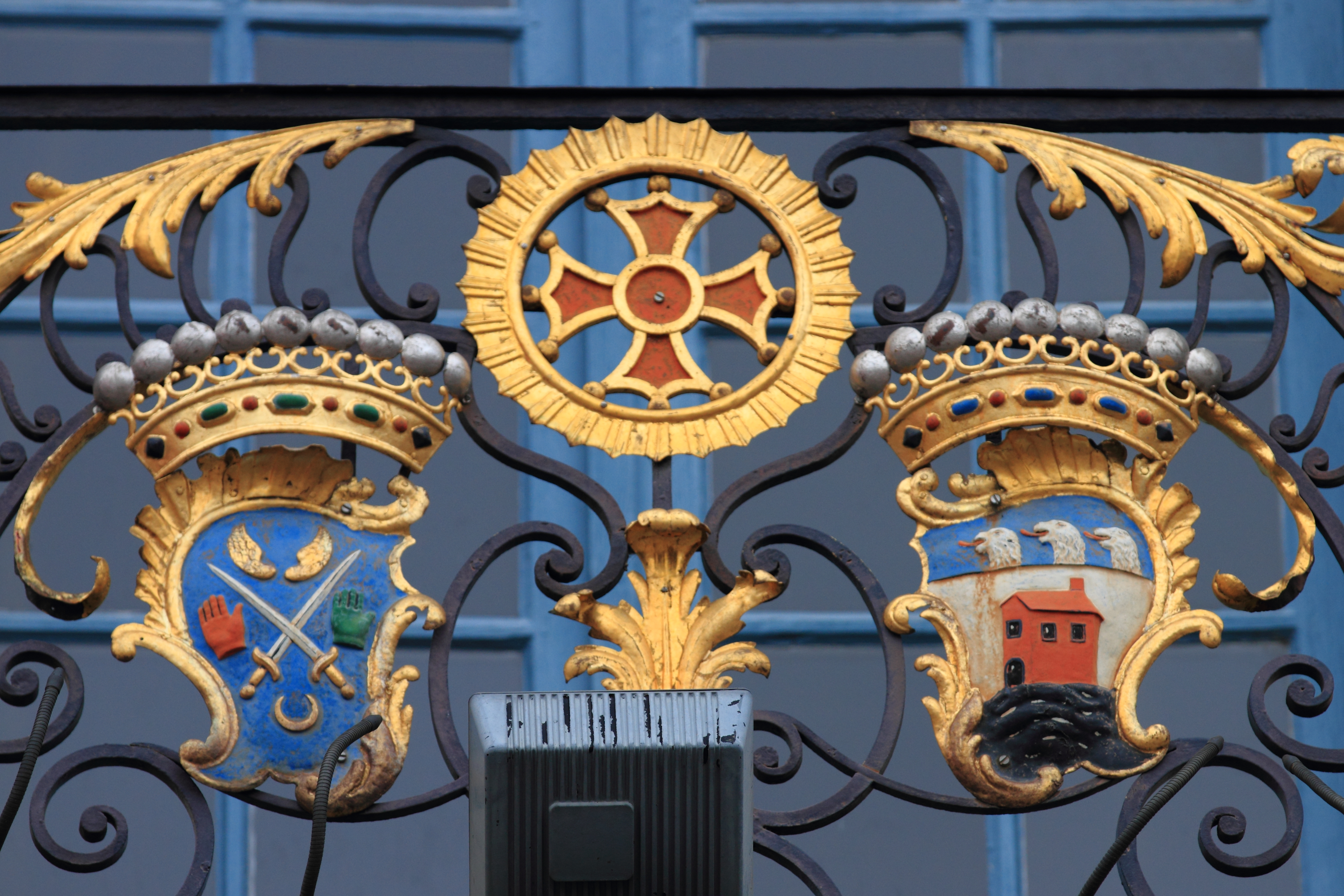
The balconies are decorated with the coats of arms of the capitouls

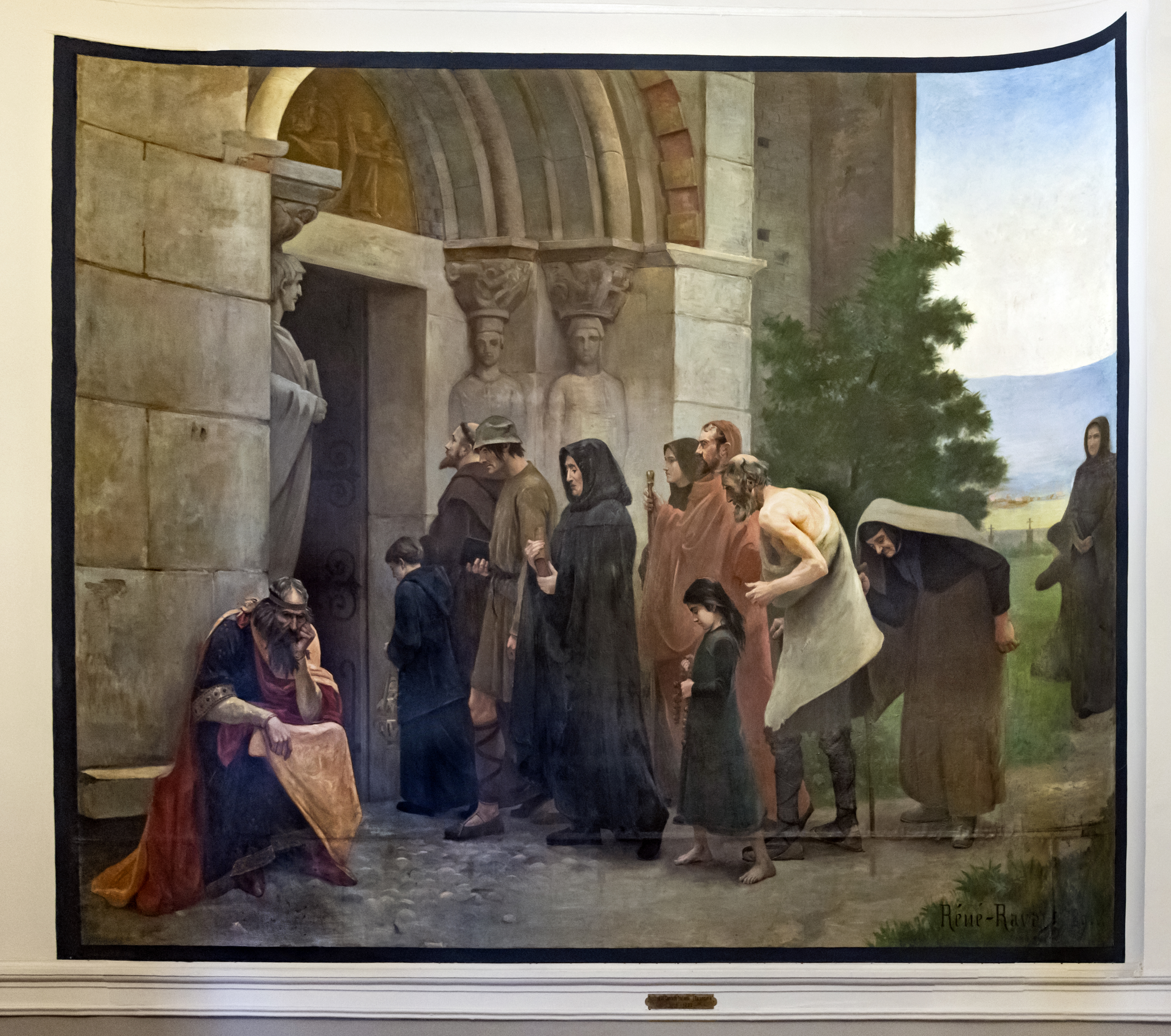
Painting of Raymond VI, Count of Toulouse, excommunicated by the Pope

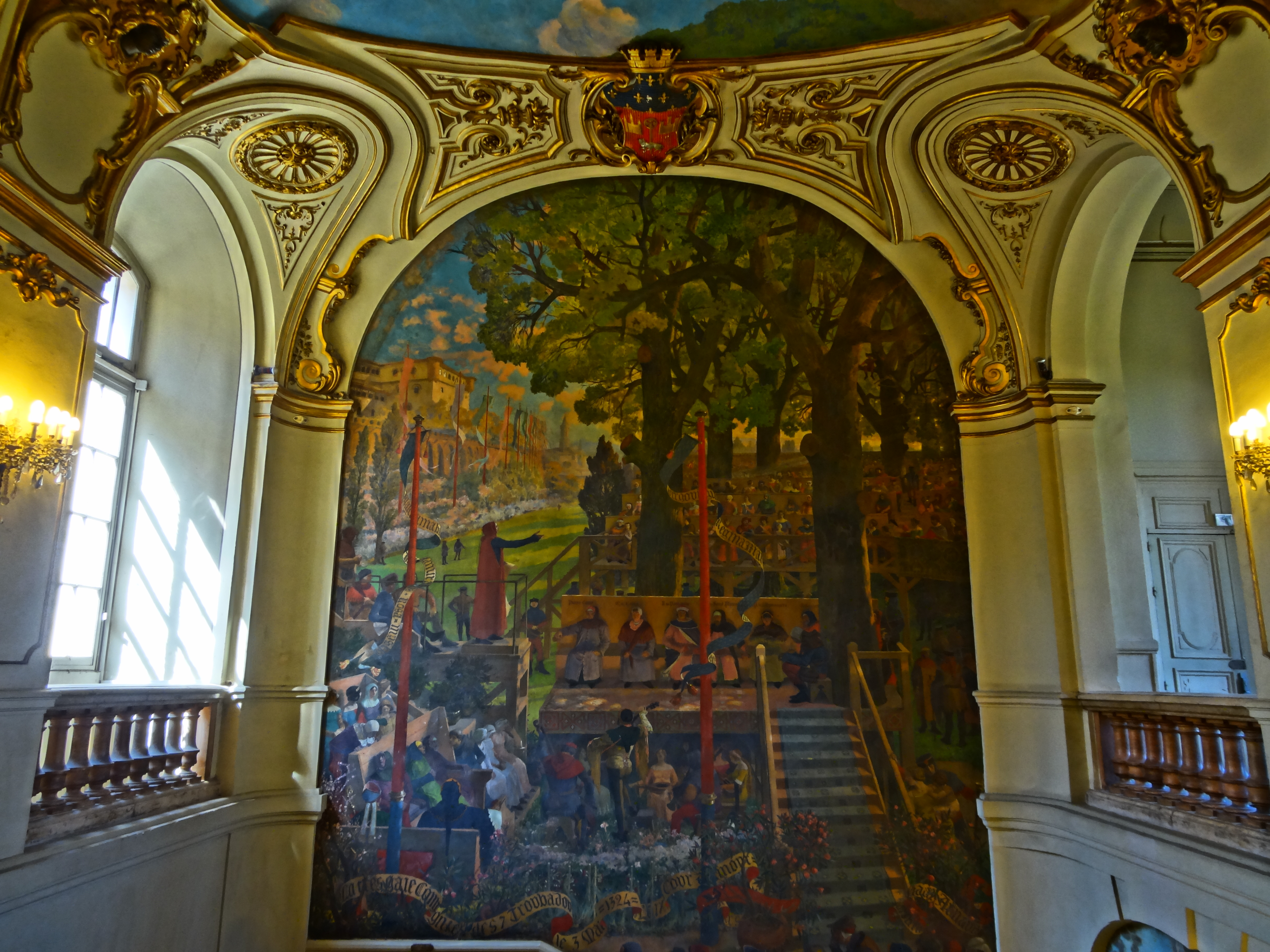
Painting of the first session of the Floral Games

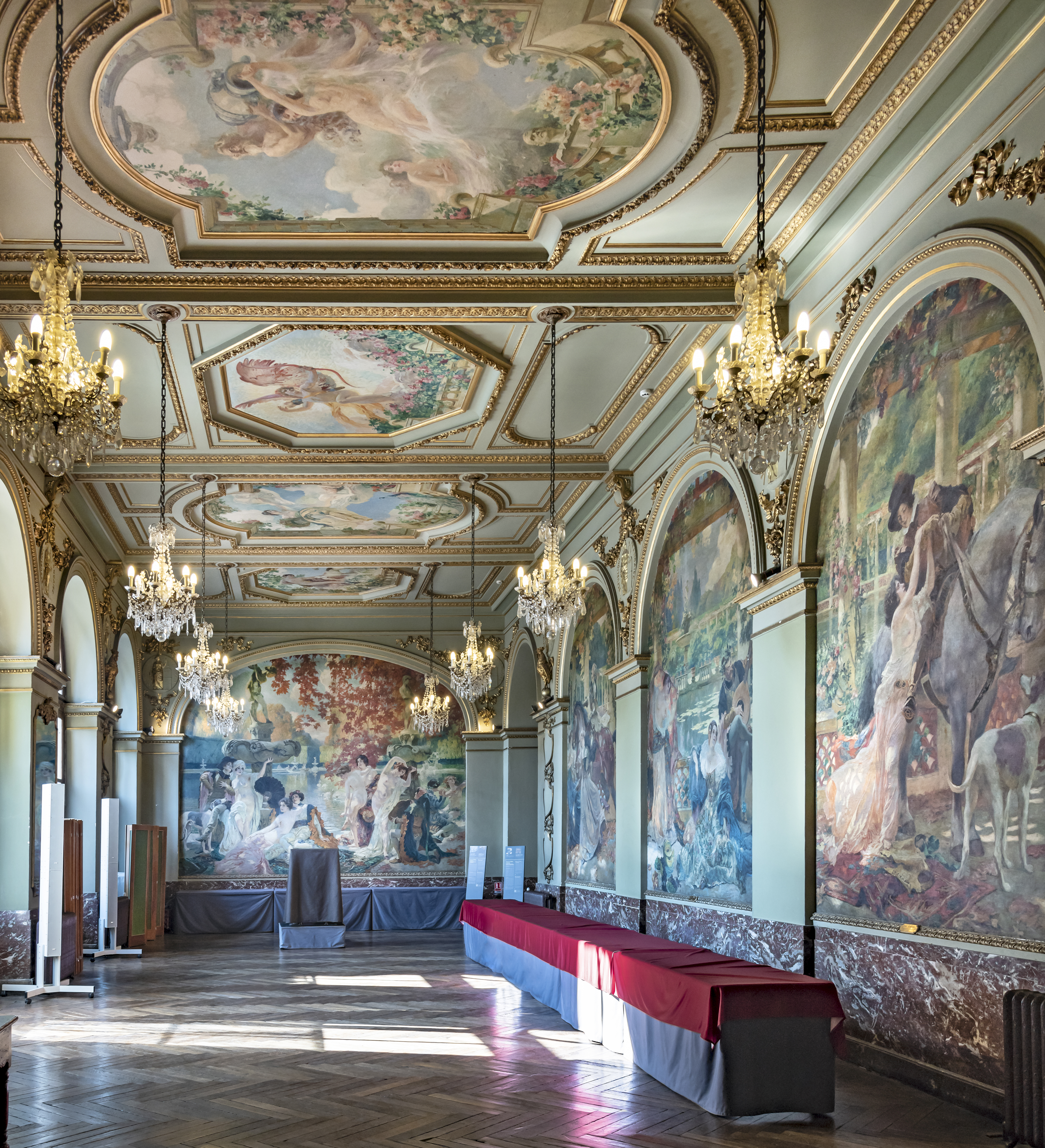
Gervais hall, former wedding hall

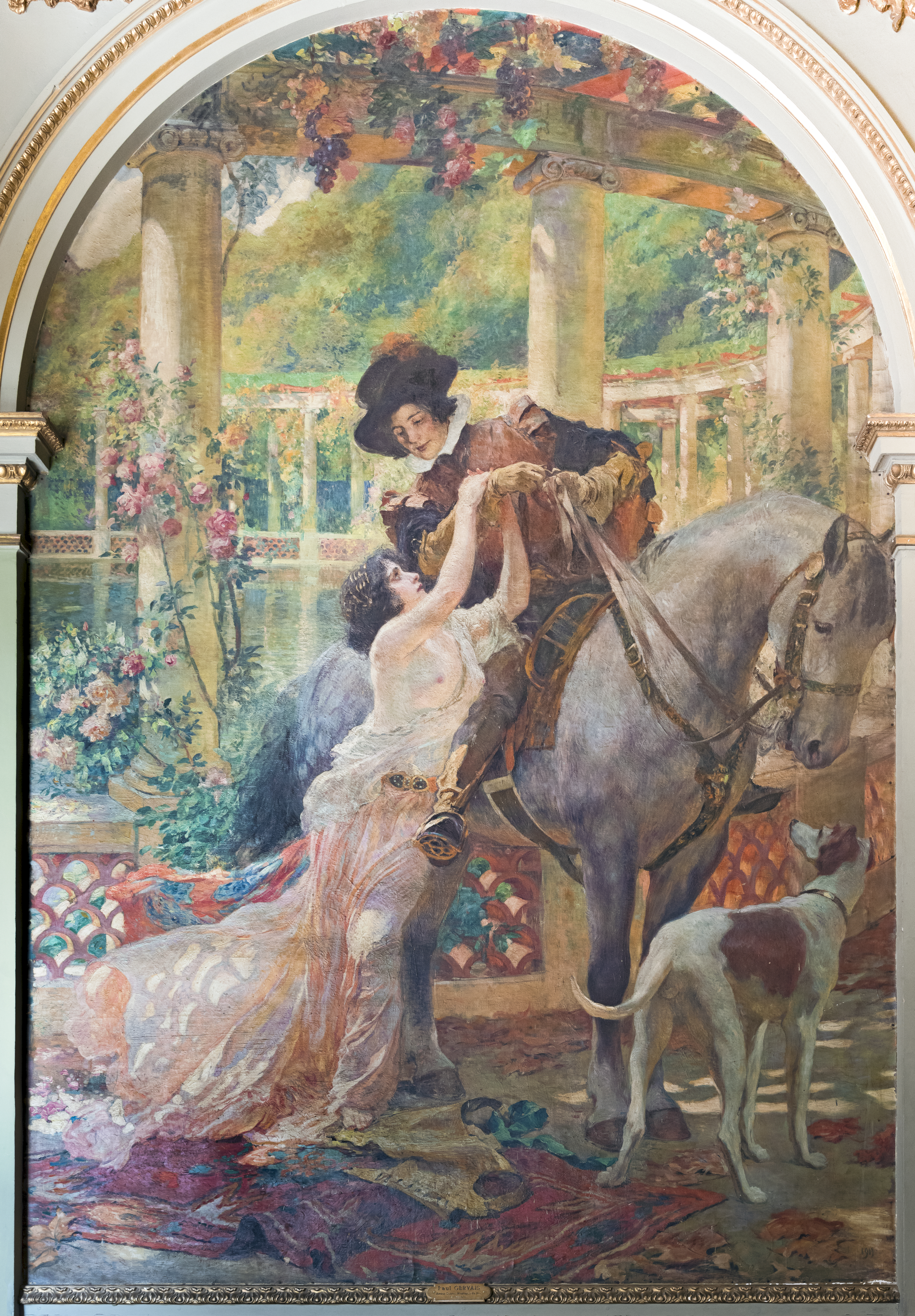
Painting in Gervais hall

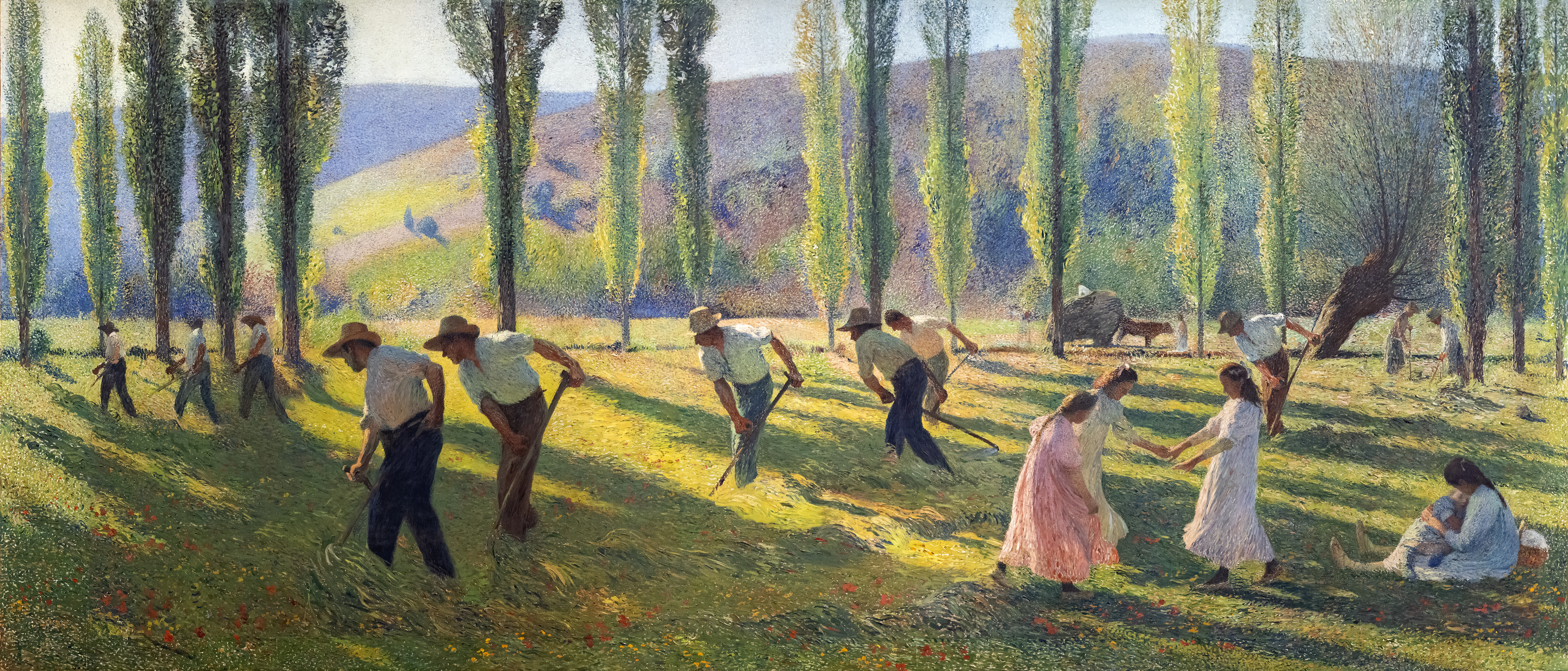
Painting in Henri Martin hall

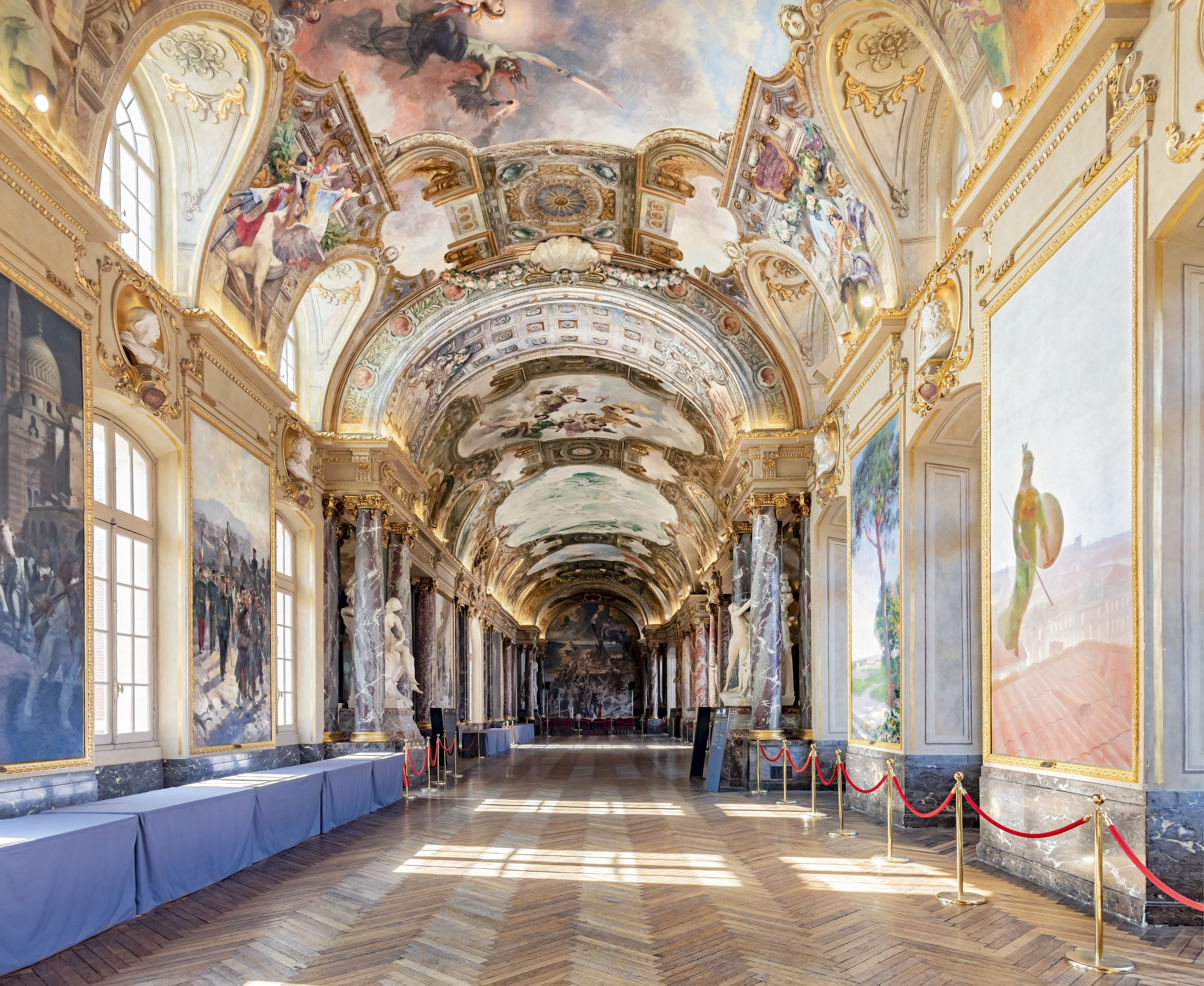
Hall of Illustrious

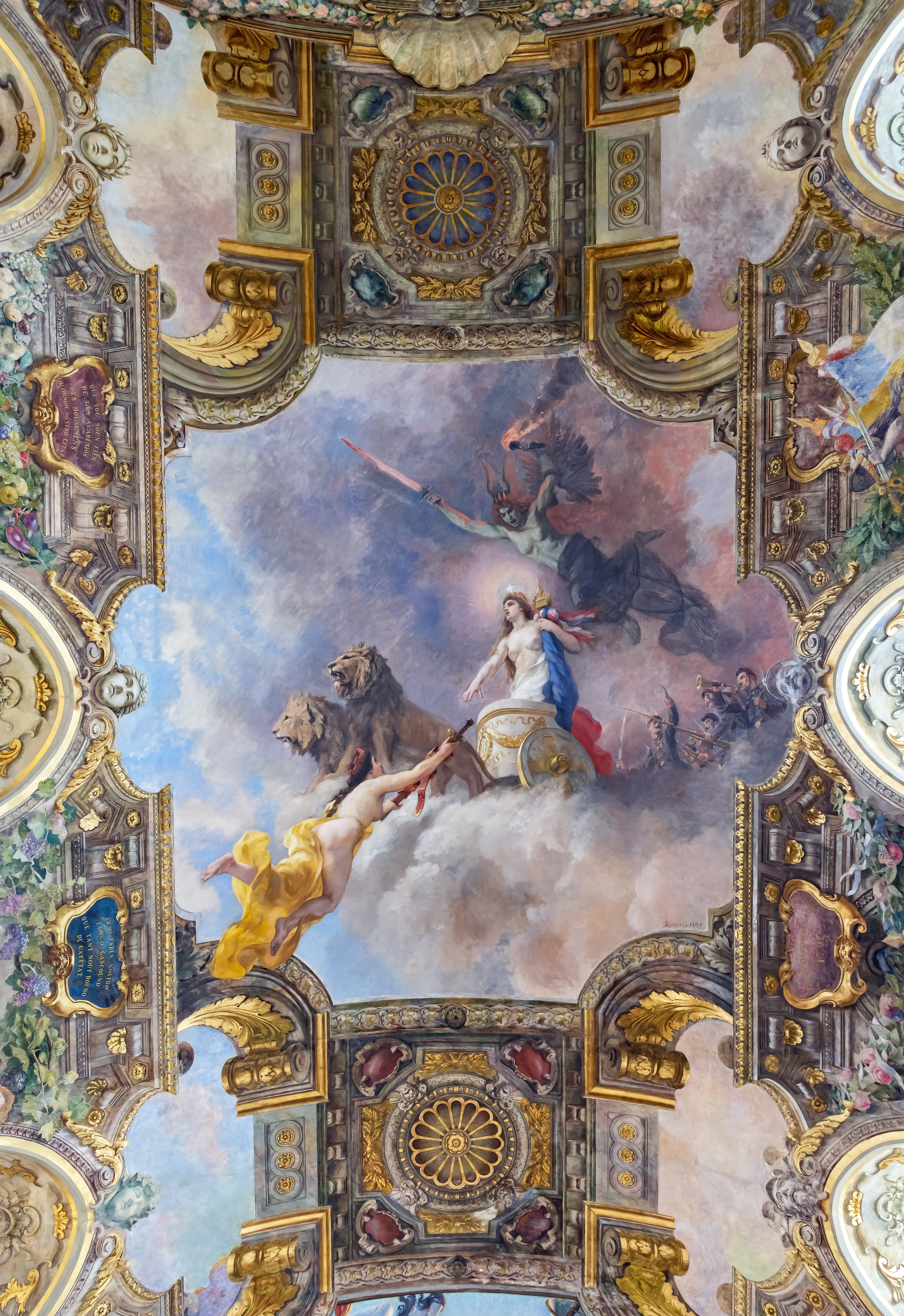
Paintings on the ceiling of the Hall of Illustrious

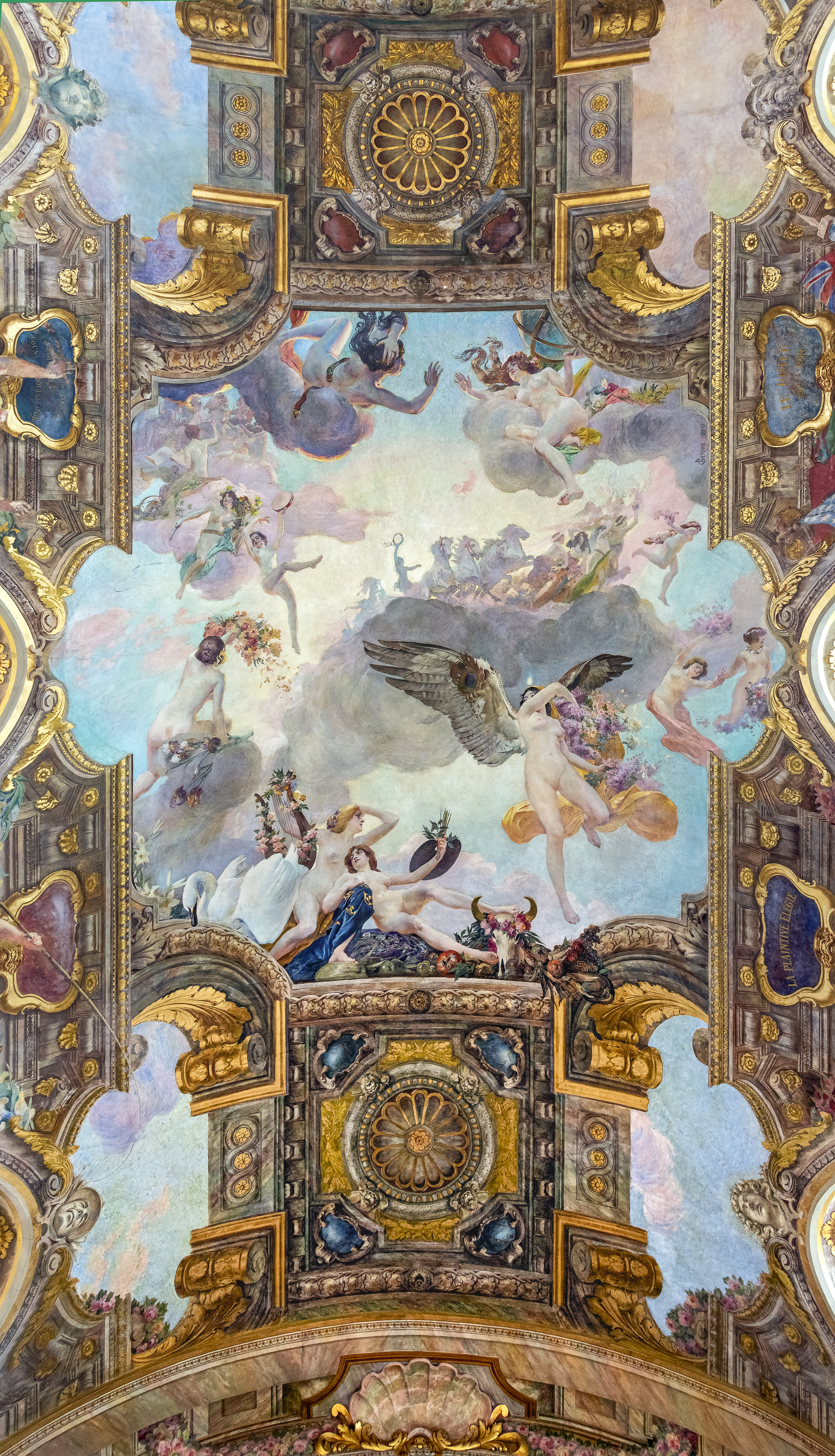
Paintings on the ceiling of the Hall of Illustrious

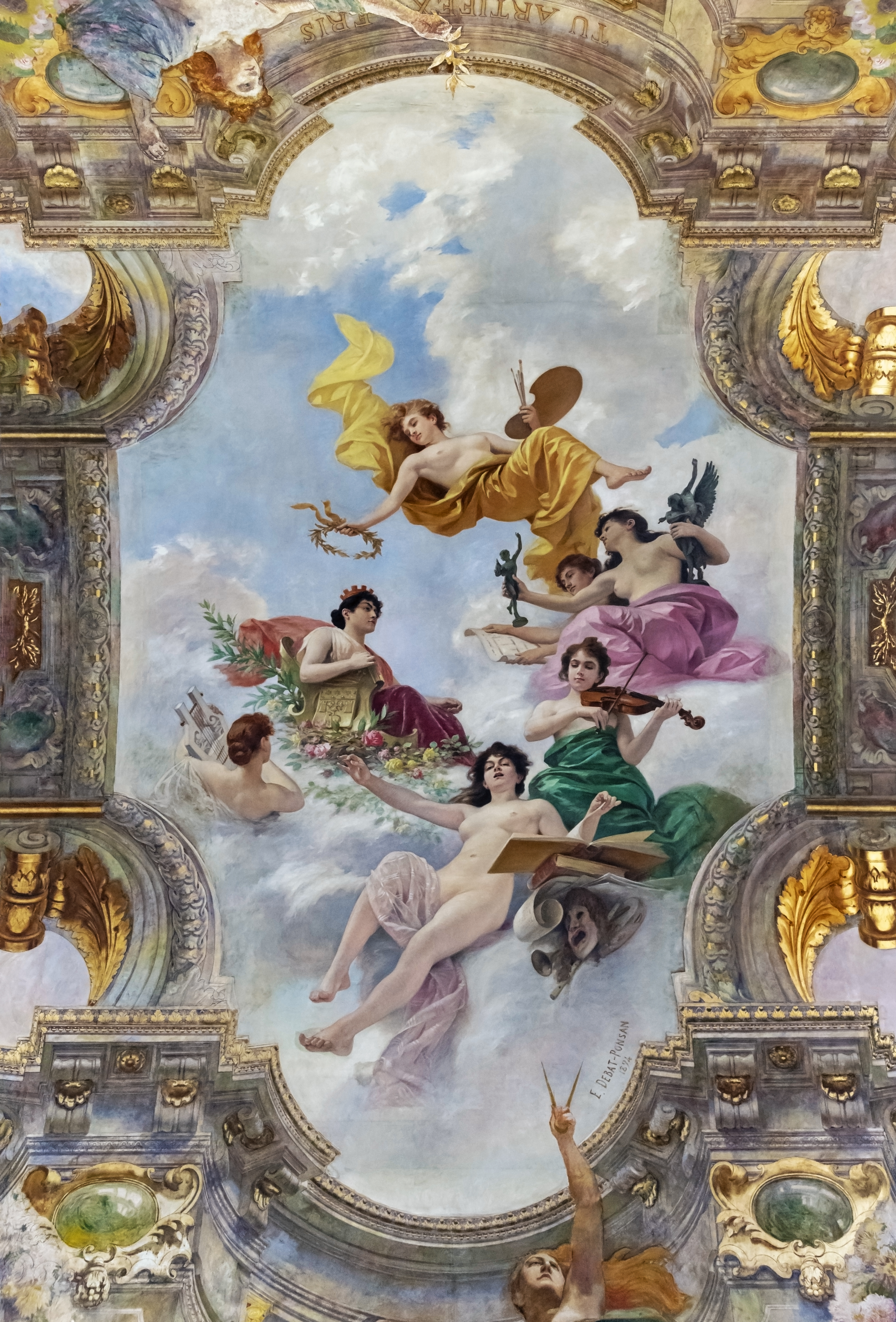
Paintings on the ceiling of the Hall of Illustrious

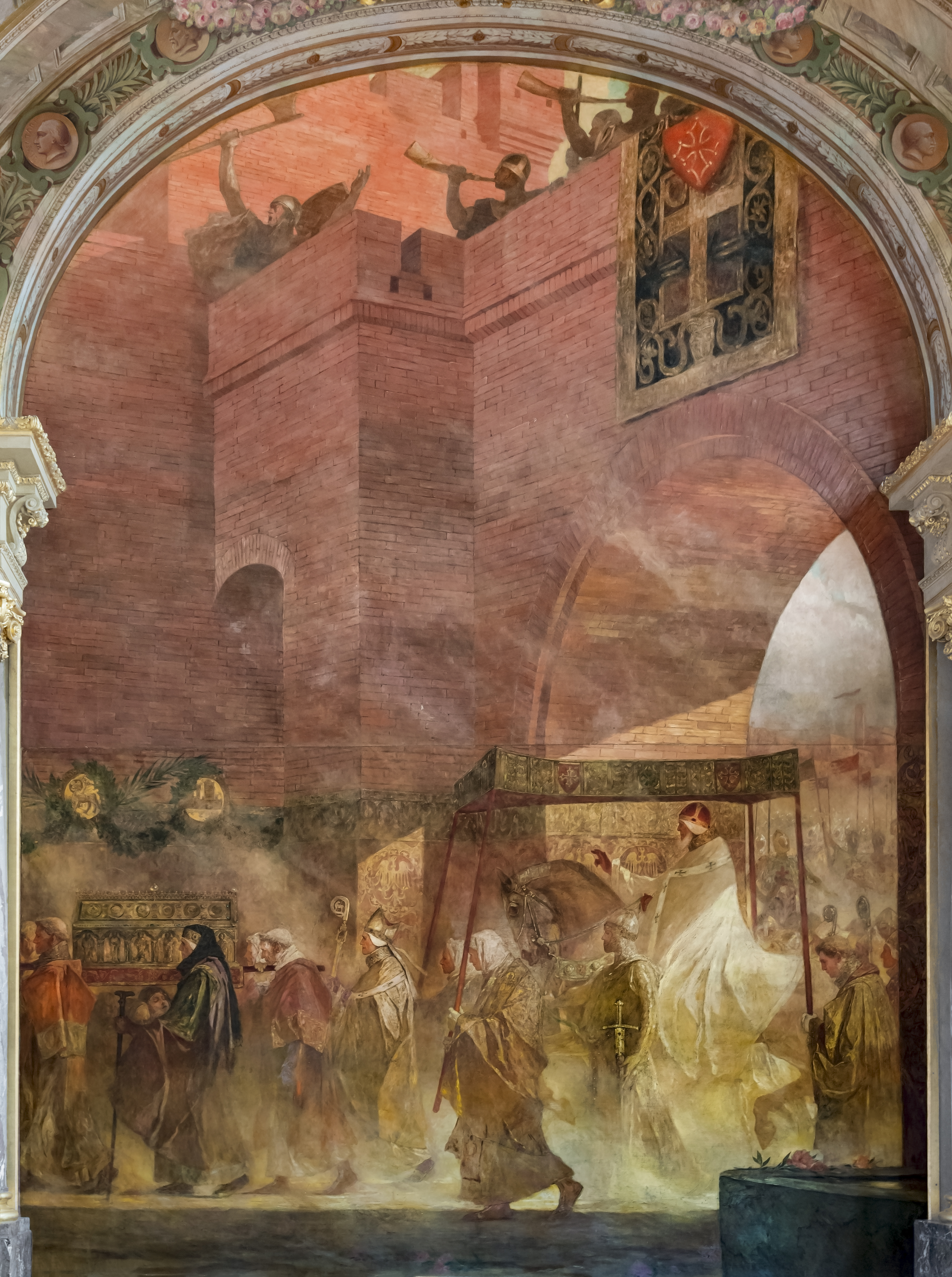
Painting on a wall in the Hall of Illustrious, representing Raymond IV welcoming the Pope in 1096

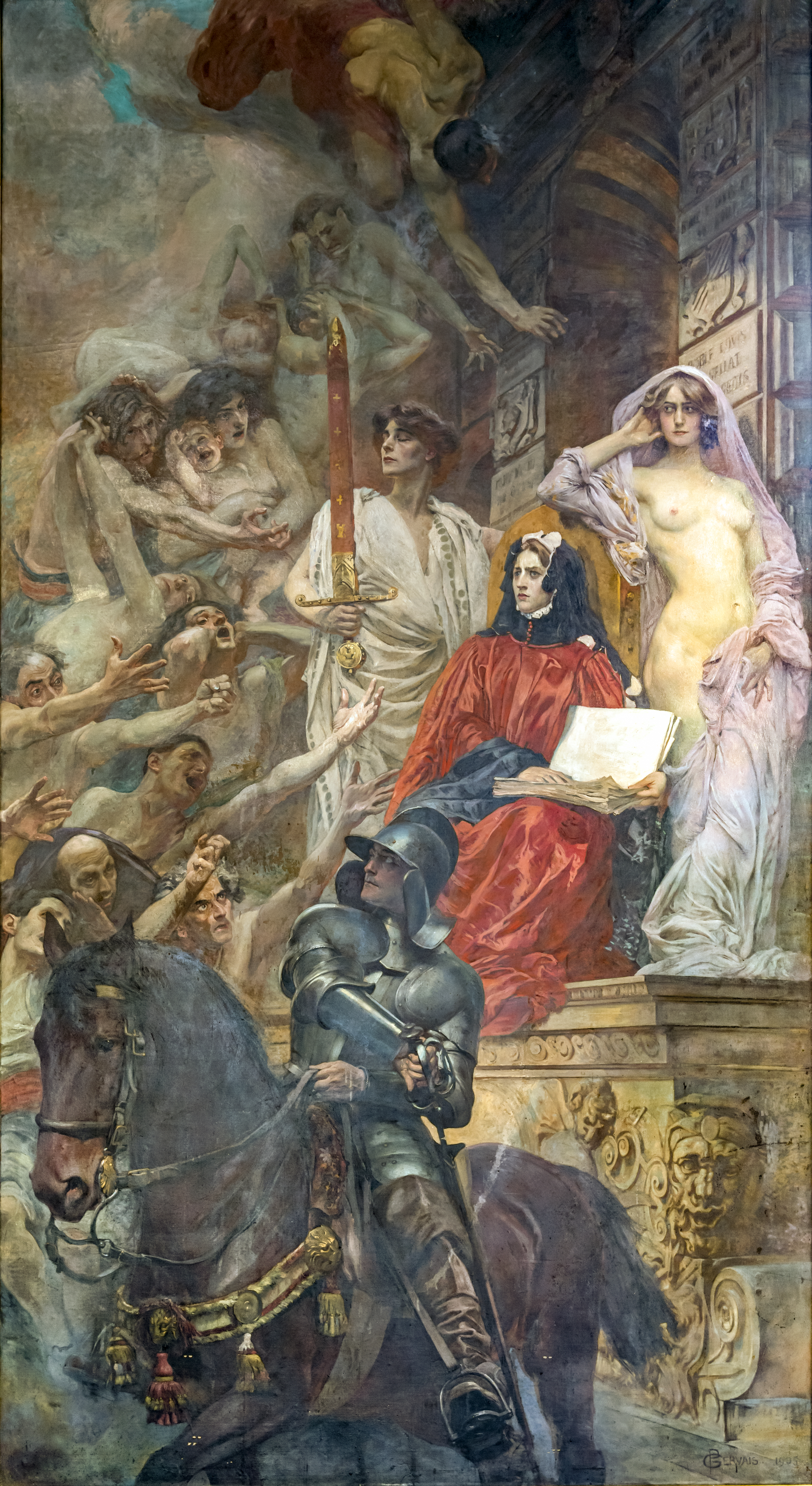
Painting on a wall in the Hall of Illustrious, Dura lex, sed lex

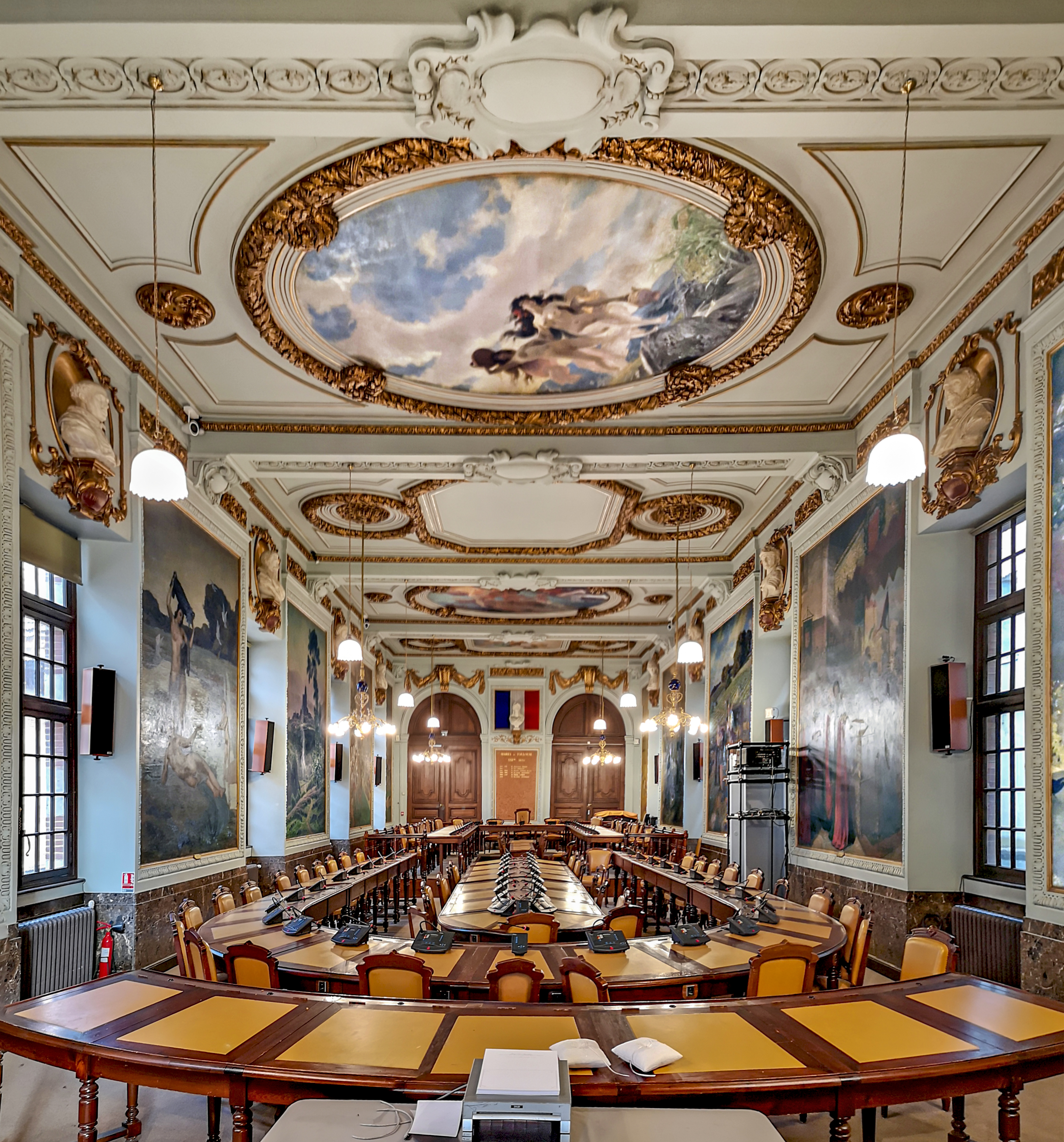
Council Chamber

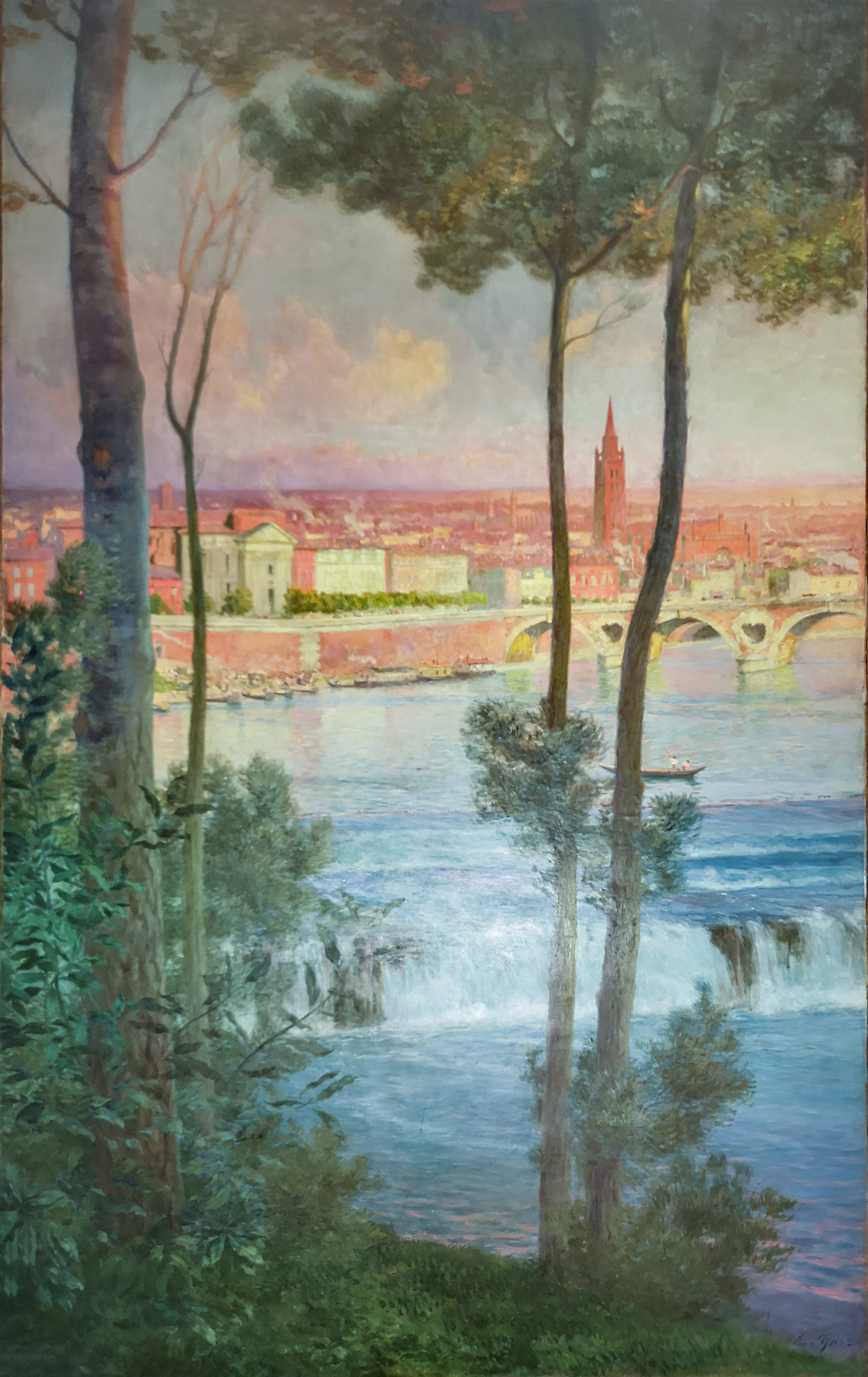
Painting of Toulouse in the Council Chamber

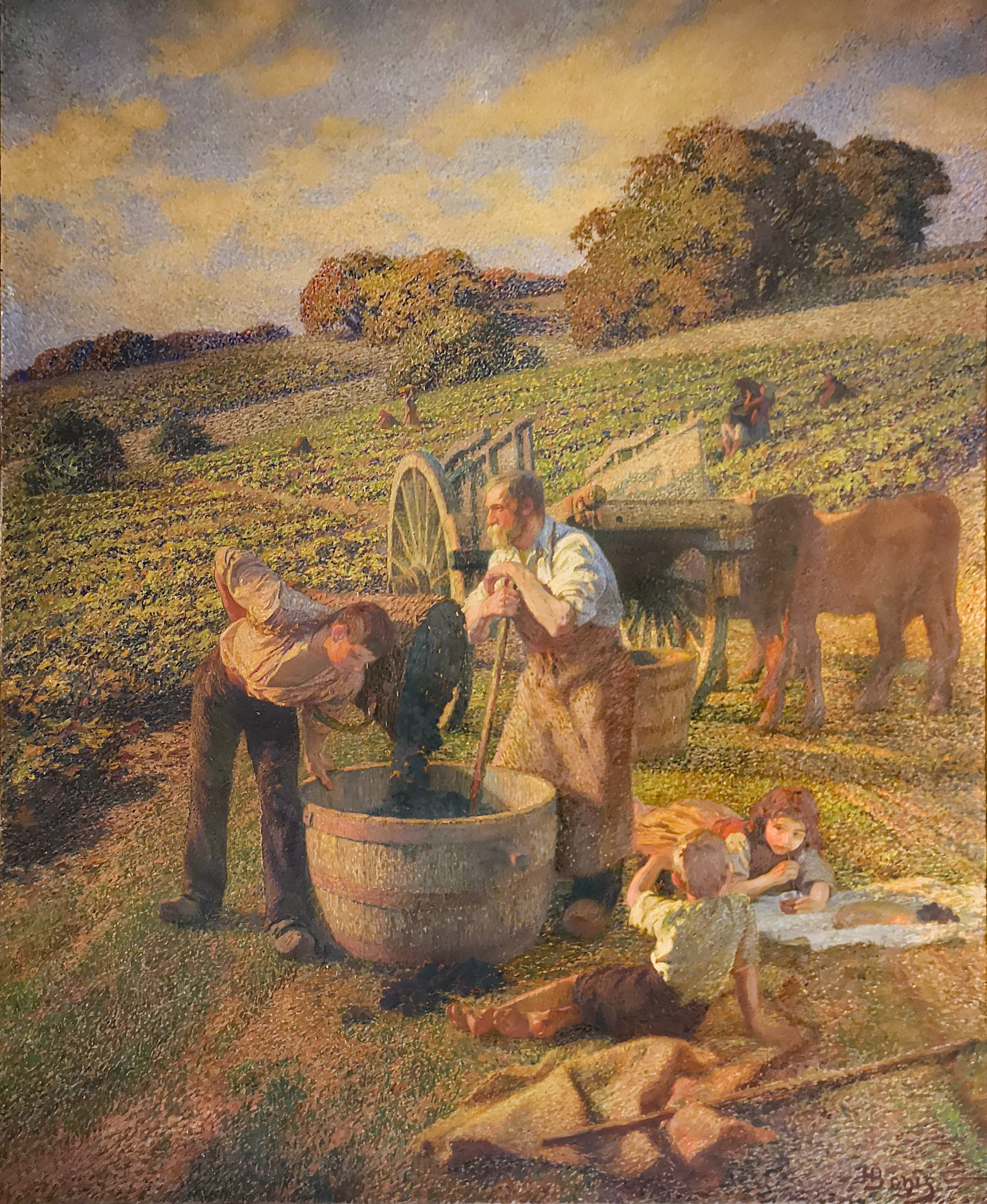
Grape harvest painting in the Council Chamber

== See also ==
- List of mayors of Toulouse
- Parlement of Toulouse
