= Pouvourville (Toulouse) =

Neighborhood of Toulouse, France

- Neighbourhood
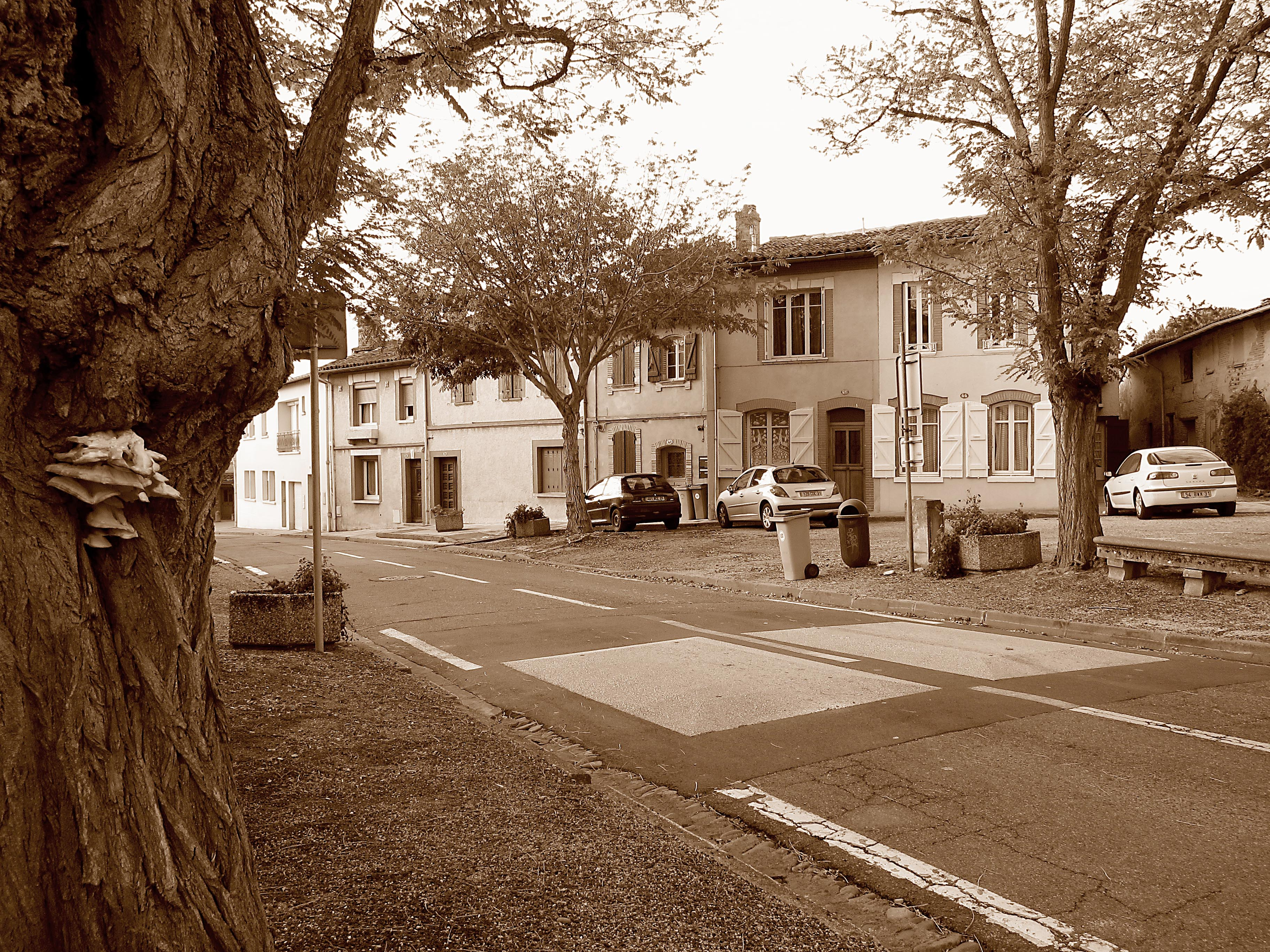
- Rue Fondeville (2012)
- Interactive map of Pouvourville
- Coordinates: 43.5500°N 1.4530°E
- Country: France
- Region: Occitanie
- Department: Haute-Garonne
- Intercommunality: Toulouse Métropole
- Commune: Toulouse
- Sector: 5 - Toulouse Sud-Est
- Public transport: Bus: 54, 115

Pouvourville is a residential suburban neighbourhood in Toulouse, Haut-Garonne, France. The neighbourhood is deeply shaped by the nearby Toulouse III - Paul Sabatier University. The density of the neighbourhood has increased since 2000 due to an increasing number of constructed units.

== History ==
It is estimated that the Pech-David plateau, where the current Pouvourville neighbourhood is located, was inhabited as early as 3000 BC. A neolithic site was discovered on the south side of the plateau in 1912 by Mr Manuel in 1912, and polished axes, pottery fragments, and animal bones were recovered from it. Similarly, pottery, generally blackish in colour, appears to date back to the Bronze Age around 1000 BC.

Numerous remains from the Roman era have been discovered in Pouverville. To date, the probable existence of three Gallo-Roman villas has been identified. One is located on the site of the Faculty of Medicine amphitheater, another near Chemin des Oliviers, and the last at the top of Chemin du Vallon. Many local residents possess various artifacts found during construction work.

In the 13th century, Pouvourville was a parish within the gardiage of the Saint-Barthélemy capitoulat.

=== Second World War ===
At the start of the second world war from 1939 to 1940, a group of Aérostiers (a unit performing aerial surveillance using tethered balloons or from hilltops) was stationed in Pouvourville. Their command post was set up at the Bousquet farm on Chemin de Narrade.

Following German invasion, a group of about 50 SS soldiers from "Das Reich" division established a presence in Pouvourville on 4 May 1944. The German military left the Tolouse area on 19 August 1944.
