= 1562 Riots of Toulouse =

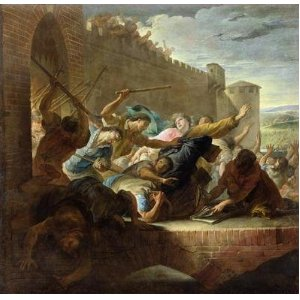
Expulsion of the Huguenots of Toulouse after the Capture of the Town by the Prince of Conde's Supporters in 1562 by Antoine Rivalz, 1727

The 1562 Riots of Toulouse are a series of events (occurring largely in the span of a week) that pitted members of the Reformed Church of France (often called Huguenots) against members of the Roman Catholic Church in violent clashes that ended with the deaths of between 3,000 and 5,000 citizens of the French city of Toulouse. These events exhibit the tensions that would soon explode into full civil war during the French Wars of Religion.

== Background ==
The history and political structure of Toulouse played a significant part in the tensions that led to the riots in 1562.

=== Medieval religious past ===
The city of Toulouse was the capital of Languedoc which had been a stronghold for Catharism throughout the 11th, 12th, and 13th centuries. In an effort to stamp out what it deemed heresy, the Roman Catholic Church had called for military action against the Cathars. These campaigns are grouped under the term the Albigensian Crusade. The Catholic hierarchy also developed the Dominican Order and the Medieval Inquisition in order to expose and eliminate this belief. Some historians, such as Edgar Sanderson, believe that the inroads that the later Reformed Church of France made in the region during the 16th and 17th centuries can be traced to a general questioning of Roman Catholic authority by the people in this region, an attitude that made Catharism so difficult to exterminate. Sanderson notes "In the contest [between Cathars and Catholics] which ensued, sometimes heretics were burnt alive, at other times Inquisitors were driven out or assassinated."

Also, as a result of the Catholic Church's sustained focus on the area, great attention was paid to ensure that the population held views seen as acceptable to Catholic orthodoxy, and great efforts were put forward to teach that orthodoxy. These two cultural factors competing in the region (questioning authority and an intense focus on doctrine) may explain how the larger part of the population (including the Parlement) was staunchly Roman Catholic, but the Reformed Church members were able to make quick inroads there.

=== Reformation ===
==== Rise of Protestantism ====
By 1530 some within the mendicant orders living in Toulouse and at its university became persuaded by the writings of Martin Luther. By 1532 Catholic authorities began a purge of the university, persecuting and then banishing several students and professors on charges of ascribing to Protestantism. Also in 1532 Toulouse produced one of the first French Protestant martyrs, when the lawyer Jean de Caturce was burnt on a slow fire. This was for making what was termed a "'Lutheran' exhortation" while merry-making on the feast of Epiphany (he recommended replacing the prayer "May Christ reign in our hearts!" with "The king drinks!").

In 1536 copies of John Calvin's Institution chrétienne were discovered in the city and the Reformed Church of France began to win converts, this despite Toulouse being the seat of Dominican Inquisition. A strange sign of the success for the Reformed Church was when on September 10, 1538, Toulouse's Catholic Inquisitor of the Faith, Louis Rochette, was strangled and burned at the stake for embracing Protestantism. By the 1540s the struggle between Catholics and Reformed Church members escalated in Toulouse. The Reformed Church members continued their activities in Toulouse for decades despite legal and popular persecution (that sometimes escalated into killing). Though the Reformed Church had appeared later in Toulouse than in other provincial capitals (such as Lyon or Rouen), by 1561 they were holding their conventicles close to the Hôtel de Ville in the expensive homes of some of Toulouse's leading citizens.

==== Psalms in French ====
In the events leading up to the riots and during the riots themselves, there was a strong reaction by Catholics against anyone singing the Psalms in French. In the late 1530s Clément Marot had translated the Psalms into French and set them to popular music. At first Marot had presented these only to the royal Court of King Francis I where they were extremely well received especially by the young Dauphin (who later became King Henry II of France). The Dauphin made his courtiers sing them with him while his musicians accompanied him on viol or lute. John Calvin caused twelve of Marot's translations to be published adding five additional Psalms translated by himself and set to music.

As the 1540s began Marot had translated around 50 Psalms and published these for the general populace, they became popular among Catholics and Protestants. In the year 1542 a rise in Catholic concerns over the spread of Protestant ideas led to several edicts against people and writings the Church deemed heretical. It was at this time the Sorbonne banned Marot's Psalms in French and issued a warrant for his arrest (which he escaped by permanently leaving the country). Theodore Beza was among those who worked translating the rest of the Psalms into French, until they were all complete.

The popularity of the Psalms in French is seen by some historians (like Strada and Rowland Prothero) as "among the chief causes of the Reformation in the Low Countries. So in France the metrical version of the Psalter, in the vulgar tongue, set to popular music, was one of the principal instruments in the success of the Reformed Church. The Psalms were identified with the everyday life of the Huguenots. Children were taught to learn them by heart; they were sung at every meal, 'to chant psalms' meant, in popular language to turn Protestant. The Psalms became the Huguenot Marseillaise."

In addition to banning the singing of the Psalms in French, Catholic doctrine held that "Alleluia" was a sign of movement from lament to praise and banned the verbalization of any Psalm containing the word "Alleluia" (Alleluatic Psalms) during funeral rites and during the penitent and solemn season of Lent (which focused on the suffering of Jesus and called for prayer, penance, repentance, almsgiving, and self-denial). Protestants did not consider themselves bound by this tradition and demanded to be free to use whatever Psalms they felt appropriate. As Catholics viewed the refraining of using these Alleluatic Psalms as a sign of respect and reverence to Jesus they viewed any Protestant singing them between the Saturday before Septuagesima Sunday (the ninth Sunday before Easter) until the night of the Easter Vigil as engaging in an especially blasphemous act.

==== Consumption of meat ====
Another easily observable practice that differentiated Protestants from Catholics during this time was the eating of meat on days prohibited by the Roman Catholic hierarchy. Catholics saw Protestants displaying, selling, purchasing, or eating meat on days prohibited by their Church as blasphemy.

Distinct from fasting (refusing all food), Catholic doctrine calls for the abstinence from "flesh meat" or soup made from meat during some days of the year (in some eras this was also extended to eggs, milk, butter, cheese, or condiments that included animal fat). Catholics hold that this helps to subdue the flesh, and is imitative of Paul the Apostle who according to 1 Corinthians 9:27 "chastised his body and brought it into subjection". Catholics also maintain that "by abstaining from flesh, we give up what is, on the whole, the most pleasant as well as the most nourishing food, and so make satisfaction for the temporal punishment due to sin even when its guilt has been forgiven." Different from fasting (refusing all food), abstinence was practiced at this time on Fridays, Saturdays, and during Lent on Sundays (total fasting on Sundays was always forbidden). Abstaining from meat during Lent was also seen as symbolically significant for in this way "no animal has to suffer death, no blood flows."

Substituting "flesh meat" with fish was de rigueur during Lent at this time, and the Catholic Church only allowed those with infirmity to eat meat. The only way healthy people could eat meat during these occasions was if they paid for a license from the clergy. Anyone who had not received permission to eat meat at this time was supposed to be subject to legal punishment from state authorities. Punishments were usually public, such as confinement to the stocks or pillory.

Denying that the Catholic Church had any other authority over them, French Protestants did not feel obligated to avoid eating meat, and where they were in control of the local government they allowed its sale during Lent. In response to this development a royal edict forbidding the sale of meat or the public serving of it was issued in 1549 (and would be issued later in 1563). All the rules concerning Catholic abstinence and fast days continued to be ignored by a majority of Protestants and openly defied in areas were Reformed Church members held a majority of the population and dominated the local consulat. This practice infuriated Catholics (later in 1601 officials in Saint-Maixent even had house-to-house sweeps to ensure suspected Protestants were not eating meat on prohibited days).

The Protestant eating of meat during the Lent that preceded the riots was a source of outrage among the Catholics that participated in the violence.

=== Municipal conflicts ===
==== Capitouls ====
Toulouse's political system was unique, which as historian Mark Greengrass states, resulted in "a city where royal judges and municipal authorities had no clear sense of their mutual responsibilities ... [it had] an old and highly developed political consciousness stretching back to its charters in the thirteenth century. Amongst its privileges was a freedom from royal taxation and an exemption from royal garrison within its walls." Each year capitouls were elected from each of the city’s eight urban districts (called capitoulats). The role of capitoul was not limited to any particular group and candidates could be seigneurs from noble bloodlines or lawyers and merchants (only officers of the Crown were ineligible). Once in office they were allowed some trappings of nobility, such as wearing a red silk gown. Any major decisions for Toulouse (such as justice, economy, and police powers) were debated and decided by a general council of the capitouls (called a consulat), and they were normally free of interference from the Crown's judges.

==== Parlement ====
An opposing center of authority in the city was the Parlement of Toulouse. The French Parlements had been established first in Paris (in 1307) and later in regional capitals by the French monarchy. (These French parlements acted as provincial appellate courts ruling on questions of law and should not be confused with legislative bodies that create laws called parliaments.)

The Parlement of Toulouse had been established by King Charles VII in 1420. Its Parlement was held in esteem second only to that of Paris.

The parlement had a surprising amount of authority and independence considering the strong centralization of power under the French monarchy. It could issue regulations for the application of both royal edicts and customary practices. It could also refuse to register any law that they held was contrary to either fundamental law or local legal customs. It could even refuse to register a law if it judged the law as untimely. Members of the Parlement were drawn from hereditary nobility with positions being purchased from the king with these positions being made hereditary by paying the Crown an annual tax called the paulette which would render them "Nobles of the Robe". With this sense of aristocracy they declared themselves exempt from gabelles and city property taxes, billeting of troops, and even tithes. They also declared that no member of Parlement could be tried by any court in the region except the Parlement itself. These privileges angered the capitouls, especially when city finances were low.

Throughout the conflicts between Catholics and members of the Reformed Church in Toulouse the Parlement was staunchly on the Catholic side. It had strong links with the clerical establishment within the city and the province, even making some provincial bishops honorary members. In 1548, as the Reformed Church continued to make converts, King Henry II charged the Parlement with forming a chambre ardente made of a president and twelve councillors in order to prosecute heretics. This action established the Parlement as the province's supreme defender of the faith. By the end of the 1540s, the Parlement had tried two hundred people suspected of Protestantism and executed at least eighteen by burning at the stake. Despite these persecutions, two members of the Parlement itself embraced Reformed ideas in 1554. They fled into exile in Geneva and were burned in effigy in Toulouse.

==== General processions ====
Like other French cities of this era, Toulouse authorities would on occasion call for a general procession. These were mass ceremonial displays that would parade through the town on holy days, civic occasions, and times of collective danger. Groups from every segment of society would be represented in the parades "from the varied officialdom and ecclesiastical orders to artisan guilds and even a delegation of the poor, took to the streets in an elaborate ceremony that in Toulouse could involve the participation of more than five thousand people". While the parades were meant as an expression of municipal unity, often rival corporations would be placed next to each other and engage in a shoving match over their placement in parade order. This would cause the parade to halt, while officials tried desperately to break up the factions with thousands of other parade participants stuck waiting. During the events that led up to the riots, the use of such parades by Catholic authorities put large numbers of Catholics on the streets that could quickly devolve into an angry mob if they encountered behavior they deemed Protestant heresy.

==== Rising tensions ====
Tensions over political prerogatives grew when the Parlement had interfered with the regular method of electing capitouls during an outbreak of plague in 1557, which caused much resentment. By 1561 nearly every aspect of how the city was run (including governance, education, and defense) became a matter of dispute between the two governing authoritative bodies. By March, reeling from war taxes and having to pay the Crown to renew its fiscal privileges, Toulouse faced massive fiscal problems. One of the capitouls advocated the sale of local Church properties to make up the deficit. This suggestion was met with dismay by the judges of Parlement and the holders of benefices residing in the city. While the capitouls discussed the idea in closed session, the judges sent two deputies to the royal court to demand that the seizure and sale of Protestant property be used instead. Some members of the Parlement along with Catholic lawyers, merchants, and "some priests" grouped together as a syndicat to direct the opposition to the alienation of Church property. This newly formed syndicat declared that Protestants were not only a threat to "true religion", but to justice and order, and to the survival of Toulouse itself.

When the humanist Collège de l'Esquille opened in 1561 with support from city funds, it immediately came under suspicion of spreading Protestantism by the Catholic clergy, members of Parlement, and by members of the pre-existing Dominican theological university (operated by the Catholic Church since 1229). Seeing preaching on Palm Sunday followed by evening prayers in its law school and then people moving about at night to have secret discussions about religion – the outraged Catholic leadership sent some of their notables to act as advisors to the capitouls. The capitouls, annoyed by this interference with their authority, ignored them completely.

Due to conflicts over political authority with Parlement, in 1562 the capitouls made all municipal jobs open to annual election rather than permanent positions. This resulted in bitter contests for the posts with a large number of these jobs going to Reformed Church members (such as clerks, some sergeants, the town crier, the treasurer, the city's syndic, and the archivist). During the riots they would play a large role in directing the Protestant cause.

=== Edicts on religion ===
With the death of the King, and a question of who would be the Regent of the new boy King, political uncertainty rested upon France on top of the ongoing religious conflict. Attempts to address some of the religious tensions were made in a series of royal edicts that would play an important role in leading up to the riots.

==== Regency issues ====
With the July 1559 death of King Henry II, quickly followed by the passing of the sixteen-year-old Francis II in December 1560, the ten-year-old Charles IX became king. His mother Catherine de Medici acted as regent. The right of regency had previously belonged to the King of Navarre, but had recently been renounced by Antoine of Navarre in favor of Catherine. This had been done with the condition that the royalty of Navarre be held as second only to Catherine herself.

When Catherine became regent, the Queen of Navarre was Jeanne d'Albret. Queen Jeanne had long expressed a desire for religious reform and in her lands Protestants were given full freedom and their books circulated unhindered.

The staunchly Catholic House of Guise which had controlled the throne when the sickly Francis II was king (side-lining Catherine), was militantly opposed by the French Reformed Church members. This opposition had even led to the Amboise conspiracy which attempted to unseat the Guise with the House of Bourbon, but was brutally put down. As Catherine succeeded in securing the regency without the Guise she sought to end religious tensions in her kingdom. (This was largely out of fear that Catholic Philip II of Spain would use the conflict as an excuse to invade and conquer.) With the death of Francis II, the Protestants' numbers were increasing as those that had fled to Geneva and Germany after the Amboise conspiracy came flooding back into the country. Once back in France many returned to publishing pamphlets vilifying the Papacy and the Guise family including its head – Francis, Duke of Guise. The amount and virulence of the publications rose to the degree that the throne of King Charles IX sent an official protest to the Senate of Geneva on January 23, 1561.

With deference due to Navarre, in accord with the regency arrangement, Catherine made the Constable of Navarre chief in her counsels. The vacillating position of King Antoine of Navarre between Protestant and Catholic sympathies continued to play a large role in the uncertainty surrounding France's religion in events leading up to the riots of Toulouse.

==== Ordinance of Orléans ====
Catherine De Medici called for a meeting of the Estates at Orléans that would address religious issues began on December 13, 1560. For her chancellor, Catherine chose Michel de l'Hôpital, a former client of the Guises. The Chancellor opened proceedings with a speech decrying persecution for religious opinion, urging toleration, and the retirement of abusive nicknames like Papist and Huguenot.

As the meeting of Estates continued in their deliberations, Navarre's Queen Jeanne declared Calvinism her new religion and the official religion of Navarre on Christmas Day of 1560. She commissioned the translation of the Bible into the native language of Basque and Béarnese. Jeanne would soon banish Catholic priests and nuns from Navarre, destroy Catholic churches and outlaw all Catholic rituals in her land.

In accord with the discussions at the meeting of Estates, on January 28, 1561, the royal Ordinance of Orléans was issued ordering every parlement to stop all prosecutions for religion and to release anyone held in prison on account of religious opinions. This ordinance has been seen as a confirmation of the Edict of Romorantin (which had been championed by Michel de l'Hôpital). The new ordinance declared freedom of conscience, but not of open worship, to all peaceful dissidents in hope of their conversion to what it declared as the truth of Roman Catholicism along with the hope that the Catholic hierarchy would accept the reforms asked for by the Protestant Estates General of Orleans.

The ordinance also demanded that any Protestants who had taken possession of church buildings and ecclesiastical property had to restore them immediately. It also forbade Protestants from destroying Catholic religious imagery and crucifixes, outlawed them from meeting within the walls of cities (but thereby allowed them to meet outside the walls), and made it a crime for Protestants to go armed to any meeting unless they were of the privileged classes.

Despite the toleration within the ordinance it was opposed by John Calvin.

In addition to having to face the extension of toleration to Protestants by the Ordinance of Orléans, the Catholic Church's position also seemed shaken by the abolishment of the arrangement made between the papacy and the French crown, the Concordat of Bologna (though this outcome was motivated by the Third Estate's fiscal concerns). Without the Concordat's rules in effect, Bishops were to be elected by a mixture of laymen and ecclesiastics who would submit three names for the King to choose from. Another reform was the requirement that any holder of a benefice must reside there.

On January 31, after the Estates had dispersed, the council met at Fontainebleau and reviewed petitions presented by Gaspard II de Coligny, "in which Protestants demanded temples." These requests were referred to a commission of the estates which had remained behind to prepare for the assembly's scheduled May 1 meeting on finance.

On March 10, the second Reformed Church synod met at Poitiers and drew up a memorandum to present the estates general set to meet on May 1. They asked that a suitable royal council be composed that would enforce the Edict of Orléans, which many strongly Catholic regions still resisted. They also wanted a Protestant representative for each province to reside at court in order to protect the interests of the Reformed churches in their areas. These deputies would act together as a body and present a confession of faith along with a petition. They would also work closely with the seigneurs at court who were sympathetic to their cause. They would act as a knowledgeable pressure group and have the backing of an efficient provincial organization.

As news of the toleration under the edict spread, Paris's Protestant population grew exponentially – all relying on divisions in the council or the protection of sympathetic nobles to keep the edict in effect.

==== 1561 Edict of Fontainebleau ====
In early 1561 Catherine de' Medici and the boy king stayed at the Palace of Fontainebleau and the confusion of where France was headed regarding religion continued.

On the one hand, claiming economic concerns, the king's council (ignoring the complaints of Gaspard II de Coligny) dismissed the Scotch guard because they were almost all Protestants including Hamilton, Earl of Arran. On the other hand, Catherine's Court was so tolerant of Protestants that it was technically in violation of the law. She allowed Protestant preachers to hold prayers and preaching daily within the apartments of any prince who sided with them (even allowing large groups to attend). While some Catholic bishops, like Moulin and Marillac, ignored the situation; others Catholic prelates (such as the papal legate) complained loudly. A Jesuit at the Court named Maimbourg listed what he saw as abuses, "not only did she [Catherine] allow the ministers to preach in the princes' apartments, where crowds gathered to hear them, while a poor Jacobin [French term for Dominican], who was preaching the Lent sermons in Fontainebleau, was deserted; but she even was present herself with all the Court ladies at the sermons of the Bishop of Valence, who preached openly, in one of the halls in the castle, the new heretical doctrines of Luther and Calvin. So sudden and complete was the change that had come over the scene that it seemed the whole Court had become Calvinist. Though it was Lent, meat was publicly sold and served on tables. No one spoke of going to hear mass, and the young king, who was taken to save appearances, went almost alone. The authority of the pope, the worship of saints and images, indulgences, and the ceremonies of the Church were all lightly spoken of as mere superstitions."

Both Francis, Duke of Guise and Anne de Montmorency were worried that the Royalty were converting to Protestantism. They were also faced with demands from the provincial states of the Île de France that lavish sums which had been given to them by Henry II (who had died in 1559) be returned to help offset national debt. Drawn together by these mutual concerns they ended their traditional bitter rivalry, and on Easter, April 6, 1561, attended Catholic Mass together. Together they formed an alliance with leading military commander Marshal Saint-André. Protestants would later give this partnership the name Triumvirate (likening their violent actions to those of the triumvirs Mark Antony, Octavius, and Lepidus in Ancient Rome).

On April 19, advised by Michel L'Hospital, the King continued to strive for peace between the faiths by issuing the 1561 Edict of Fontainebleau (not to be confused with similarly named edicts from 1540, and 1685). This edict forbid injuring or denouncing anyone on matters of faith, of damaging or seizing property of those of a different denomination, and of any provocation of others over religion. It outlawed the use of epithets like "Papist" or "Huguenot".

The new edict forbade officers of the King from entering Protestant homes "under pretext of former edicts forbidding illicit assemblies." It ordered the release of any Protestant arrested on these grounds, who were to go free "provided, however, that they lived henceforth as Catholics and without creating any scandal."

The Parlement of Paris refused to register the edict, holding that its tendency would increase the number of Protestants. This was the same reaction by many other parts of France when examined by governors and tribunes and it was widely condemned from Catholic pulpits. The idea that the Crown would command that Protestants' personal safety and that of their homes (where they practiced their rites) had to be respected was so new and in such contrast to every royal edict before it, that many rejected it outright.

Most of the Catholic clergy decried the edict, such as a priest at Provins who refused to obey the command against denouncing anyone on matters of faith, saying "And now, gentlemen of Provins, what ought I, what ought the other preachers of France to do? Ought we to obey this edict? What will you say to us? What shall we preach? 'The Gospel,' says the Huguenot. To say that the error [of the Protestants]...is damnable heresy, is not this to preach the Gospel? To say that the Huguenots of France are wicked apostates, who have forsaken the true Catholic Church to follow heresy, is not this to preach the Gospel? To warn men against their doctrine, against hearing them of reading their books; to tell men that these doctrines tend and aim only to incite to sedition, robbery, and murder as they have already begun to do in the city of Paris and in numberless other places in the land, is not this to preach the Gospel? But does anyone say to me, 'Brother, what say you? You are not obeying the king's edict: you are speaking of Calvin and his companions, and you call them, and those who hold their opinions, heretics and Huguenots; you will be brought to trial; you will be put in prison; you will be hanged as a traitor.' I reply that it is possible it may be so, for Ahab and Jezebel put to death the prophets of God in their day, and granted liberty to the prophets of Baal. 'Now, brother, you are going too far; you will get yourself hanged.' Well, be it so; there will be one Franciscan friar hanged, and they will have to hang many more, for god by His Holy Spirit will inspire the pillars of His Church to uphold to the end the building which can never be destroyed."

The measures towards toleration emboldened the Protestants who began to actively resist all policies trying to limit their faith. There were riots at Bavais, the Cardinal of Chatillon's episcopal residence, and severe riots in Paris. In the suburb of St Germain, an assembly of worshipping Protestants was attacked by an angry Catholic mob (mostly students). Several of the attending noblemen were armed and met the attack with swords drawn, the fight ended with many of the Catholics slain. The Catholic mob dispersed but returned the next day – only to meet the same results.

In some places (such as Issigeac on February 24, 1561) Protestants took over Catholic churches by force and in some occasions Catholic churches were broken into and church property destroyed (actions referred to as Iconoclasm). An example of such incidents occurred on May 18, 1561, when "marauding Protestant bands attacked and pillaged the satellite parish churches of St Pardoux, Monsaguel, Montaut, and Monmarvés, breaking and burning altars, images and relics, books and habits." Historian Mark Greengrass notes that this kind of activity happened in small towns around Toulouse "where there had been innumerable incidents involving image-breaking, ridiculing priests, profaning altars and mocking at Catholic services." He also notes "Some of the image-smashing in surrounding towns had been engineered by Catholics in order to create Catholic animosities." All these types of behavior would be repeated when the riots broke out in Toulouse.

==== Edict of July ====
The violent unrest of Protestants demanding religious freedom and Catholics demanding the state not permit the nation to allow what they saw as a wicked corruption, created an opportunity for Charles, Cardinal of Lorraine (the brother of Francis, Duke of Guise), to come forward as the head of the Catholic Church in France. Earlier (on April 25, 1557) the Cardinal had secured a brief from Pope Paul IV appointing him and the Cardinals of Bourbon and Châtillon as Grand Inquisitors of France to begin an Inquisition modeled after the Spanish Inquisition to eliminate Protestantism. (This was only derailed by popular outcry from the majority of the French population.) Gaining authority in the religious chaos of 1561, the Cardinal insisted that the laws establishing Catholicism as the official religion be enforced by the secular arm.

On 23 June 1561 to address the continuing unrest a Royal Council and the spiritual and temporal peers met the Parlement of Paris at the Palais de Justice. Hoping that an upcoming session of the Council of Trent or a proposed National Council of French Catholic bishops would resolve the issue for them, they tried to determine what should be done until then. They debated the issue for three weeks.

One faction demanded that all Protestants (deemed heretics) without conditions should be executed by the state. An opposing faction called for all penal proceedings to be suspended until the issue was determined by the Council of Trent. The vote to accept the policy of toleration was defeated eighty votes to seventy-two. In the end, the policy that gained the most support called for a sentence of death for anyone who attended a Protestant conventicle, but that any case of simple heresy be decided only by an ecclesiastical court and those condemned should be pardoned if they agreed to live as a Catholic, and those who refused would receive no punishment greater than banishment – the Edict of July was drawn up on July 11, 1561, following this majority opinion (though it was mitigated in some places by the chancellor). The edict forbade "under penalty of confiscation of person and goods, all conventicles and public assemblies, with or without arms, together with private assemblies in which there should be preaching or the administration of the sacraments in forms other than those received and observed by the Catholic Church." It prohibited "all enrollings, signatures, or other things tending to sedition." Any cases mixing heresy with sedition would be tried by presidial judges instead of Catholic clergy. It reiterated all the previous injunctions against disturbing the peace, using religious based insults, slandering or making false charges, and commanded all preachers to abstain from inciting violent passions in their congregations, - declaring death by hanging for breaking any of these laws.

In the end neither faith was pleased by the Edict of July, Protestants held that they had been deceived, Parlement held that the mitigations of the chancellor had weakened the wording they had supported. This resulted in the edict being only provisionally registered. Because of the vigorous opposition of Protestant leaders during the crafting of the edict it largely remained a dead letter, Gaspard II de Coligny was particularly outspoken in his opposition, saying that "to attempt thus to constrain the reformed to accept the Romans religion against their conscience was a great absurdity amounting to an impossibility." Despite general dislike for the edict, Catholic Duke of Guise stated his support declaring that his "sword would never rest in its scabbard when the execution of this decision was in question."

Though the Council edict was not viewed as a success, they did decide that there would be conference between Catholic bishops and reformed ministers (who would be granted safe conduct) to meet at Poissy. Originally scheduled for August 18 the Colloquy at Poissy would be postponed until October due to a meeting of the Estates General on the state of French finances.

At the meeting of General Estates on August 26 the third estate continued to deride the cost the upkeep of the Catholic clergy was having on the merchants and bourgeoisie. Their representative Jacques de Bretagne, magistrate of Autun demanded ecclesiastical property face alienation. They held that of the 120 million livres the clergy were taking out of the economy if 48 million were set aside the clergy could live off the 4 million in interest per year that such a move would still provide, leaving 72 million for France to use to clear up its debts and stimulate the economy. The representative of the nobility took similar grounds and even demanded for the Protestants the right to assembly (totally dismissing the Edict of July out of hand). The Catholic clergy went absent from these debates, marking their opposition by meeting by themselves at St. Germain. L'Hospital met them there still seeking liberty for the Protestants, telling the Catholic clergy "As to the Protestant assemblies, they cannot be separated from their religion; for they believe that the Word of God strictly enjoins them to assemble themselves to hear the preaching of the Gospel and to partake of the sacraments, and this they hold as an article of their faith."

Having set forth their grievances, the Estates deputies left, and the focus fell on the upcoming Colloquy of Poissy.

==== Effect on Toulouse ====
When the lettres de cachet announcing the Edict of Orléans (with its toleration of Protestants) arrived in Toulouse, the Parlement registered it tardily and interpreted it harshly only releasing prisoners suspected of heresy if they abjured their faith first. The 1561 Edict of Foutainebleau was received by the Parlement with even greater disdain. In contrast the capitouls arrested three Catholic preachers (including a Jesuit priest and a monk) for traitorous remarks regarding Catherine de Médici for her feebleness towards members of the Reformed Church.

During 1561's season of Lent, university students (many of them sons of Toulouse's magistrates) who had accepted the doctrine of the Reformed Church began to riot against Catholic authority. When met with a response many of them fled during the Easter period to nearby towns along the Garonne river to escape.

By the summer of 1561 the conventicles began to meet at nighttime in the city squares. All the while, religious disturbances continued to flare up throughout the region and cartloads of people arrested on charges of heresy continued to be brought into the city.

With the toleration imposed by the edicts official persecution of the Protestants ceased and their worship services were unaccosted. In early 1562 Toulouse's Reformed Church members started meeting outside the walls of the city. The number of Reformed Church members in Toulouse had grown to one-seventh of the total population which is estimated at between 35,000 and 60,000. They were "for the most part, burghers, merchants, professors of the university, men of letters, students, and magistrates." They had even elected a Protestant majority among the eight capitouls.

The numbers of the Reformed Church members of Toulouse were great enough to require five pastors to serve them. Seeing the toleration edicts as a license to worship openly, the Reformed Church members built a wooden church outside the town gates with an occupancy between five and six thousand worshippers. Their first wooden "temple" was structured like a large elaborately fashioned covered barn or town market and was built outside the Porte Villeneuve (one of the gates in the city's defensive wall).

Not only men but women openly expressed their faith, a contemporary account notes "They had laid aside their prayer-books and beads which they had worn at their girdles, their ample robes, and dissolute garments, dance, and worldly songs, as if they had been guided by the Holy Ghost". Large numbers of students were also attracted to the Reformed Church in Toulouse including the student preacher Able Niort. Other notable Reformed preachers in Toulouse were Bignolles (ambitious but with a difficult personality) and Jean Barrelles who had been trained in Geneva, censured by the Sorbonne, and had served a prison sentence in Toulouse.

With continuing reports of unrest in Southern France, Catherine de Médici sent a governor to Toulouse to oversee the defense of the city. The Parlement registered his commission on September 24, 1561, but he was openly opposed by the capitouls who did not let him enter the city. He was only able to enter when the election of new capitouls was held.

Things looked hopeful for the Reformed Church throughout France with the October 1561 Colloquy of Poissy.

In Toulouse the newly elected capitouls faced quick criticism from the Parlement who sought to revoke their election. The town militia, which had been reviewed on Christmas Eve to quell any ideas of violence, was also criticized by Parlement, who charged it had been turned into a Protestant military force by the capitouls.

Catholic suspicion over Protestant loyalty to France was heightened when staunchly Catholic Blaise de Lasseran-Massencôme, seigneur de Montluc arrived in Bordeaux in December 1561 to share the royal lieutenancy of Guyenne with Charles de Coucis, seigneur de Burie. There he discovered that the Reformed Churches in Guyenne had adapted the church structure of synods, colloquies, and consistories to build a Protestant military organization (Gueyenne had been divided into seven colloquies, where each church within it had its own military captain). Monluc was offered a bribe of 40,000 écus to not oppose them. Two chefs-général or "protectors" had been elected for each of the areas of the parlements of Bordeaux and Toulouse. There were fears that this organization was a planned attempt to turn Guyenne into a republic modeled after Geneva.

In January 1562, the Edict of St. Germain was issued officially recognizing the existence of French Protestants and guaranteeing freedom of conscience and private worship. It forbade Protestant worship within towns but permitted Protestant synods and consistories. The Edict of St. Germain arrived in Toulouse in February 1562 and the Parlement was displeased to see it, as like all other parlements it had been removed from enforcing the limited rights of worship given to Protestants. The capitouls in contrast, fully endorsed and enforced the edict. The Parlement only registered the edict with the provision that "in cases of necessity or abuse, it would administer the edict itself." As the capitouls applied the edict, they found that the Parlement was fully prepared to obstruct them as much as possible.

By March 1562 notable members of Toulouse's community formed a Reformed Church Consistory (a congregation's governing body of elected officials that include the Elders and the Deacons). By this time the Reformed Church in Toulouse was already baptizing, marrying, and providing funerals for its members.

== Escalations ==
The majority of the Catholic citizenry of Toulouse were unhappy about the edicts requiring toleration to Protestants and in many instances were only held to compliance with it by the police powers of the city's militia. On February 7, 1562, a militia of one hundred soldiers was called out to keep armed Catholics and armed members of the Reformed Church separated. The militia guarded an open-air service Reformed Church members held at their barn-like church building (which had been built outside the defensive walls of Toulouse in 1558). This service, with Abel Niort preaching, was the first one open to any and all interested in hearing the ideas of the Reformed Church and brought out 5,000 attendees. The Catholics already upset by the news that Reformed Church members had taken possession of a number of towns very close to Toulouse set up demonstrations to counter the event. As the Reformed members sang Psalms at their service, the Catholic authorities called for public prayers, citywide fasts, and held a general procession parade (putting thousands of Catholics on the street). A Franciscan named Melchior Flavin was so strident in his tone that his effect on the Catholic faithful made the capitouls fearful of a breach in the peace.

As tensions mounted, a man by the Dalbade river was caught singing Psalms during the season of Lent – he was stoned to death by a Catholic mob and then his body was dragged to the palace of Parlement.

When a member of his listening audience thought a Dominican preaching at the Basilica of St. Sernin was speaking heresy, he yelled "You lie, you sneaking monk!", and then murdered the preacher.

In another instance one of the town guard ordered to protect a Protestant congregation during its services in the faubourgs accidentally shot a Reformed Church member in the head.

=== National events ===
While emotions in Toulouse continued to escalate, events throughout France did nothing to ease these emotions but indeed inflamed them all the more.

==== Court manoeuvring ====
Under Spanish promises of his own independent kingdom (rather than being a vassal king), Antoine of Navarre secretly sided with the Duke of Guise and his Catholic allies (often referred to as the Triumvirate). Antoine began taking lessons on Catholicism and quarreled with his wife about his desire to take their son to Catholic Mass or to attend the Catholic baptism of the Spanish ambassador.

The Spanish ambassador told Catherine de Medici in the name of his King that she must banish the Protestants Jeanne d'Albret, Coligny, and D'Andelot from the royal court, and must command Antoine's wife to raise their son within Catholicism. Catherine expelled him from France and took other action against a couple of the Triumvirate's aristocrat supporters. Her reaction angered Antoine who moved closer to the Triumvirate.

Religious riots were breaking out accompanied by bloodshed in Sens, Abbeville, Tours, Marseilles, Toul in Lorraine, and in Cahors and Agen (where Montluc brutally suppressed them). In most cases the Protestants were on the losing end of these conflicts.

==== Massacre of Vassy ====
Though the city was about 500 miles north of Toulouse, the Massacre of Vassy that occurred on March 1, 1562, was seen as a dread event by Protestants throughout France. In Languedoc at (Béziers, Cahors, Carcassonne, Castelnaudary and Grenade) spontaneous Protestant revolts occurred upon hearing of the massacre.

The events that led to the Massacre center on Francis, Duke of Guise. The Duke had travelled to Saverne to meet with the Lutheran Duke of Württemberg on February 15, 1562. There Guise worked to convince the German Lutherans that the French Reformed Church and its recognition of Calvin were working against the interests of other Protestants and was able to secure a promise of neutrality should there be armed conflict between the Catholic French and the Reformed Church of France. Upon returning to France, the Duke left Joinville with a contingent of his troops, having been informed of Protestant worship in the town of Vassy, and began to journey towards Paris to re-join the royal court. Adjusting his route to go through Vassy on March 1, 1562, his troops encountered a Reformed Church service in progress, having heard its bells from afar. The interchange between Guise's troops and the Reformed members resulted in the Massacre of Vassy. The results were the deaths of 63 Reformed Church members and the wounding of hundreds more, along with their church being burnt to the ground.

On March 16 the Duke, along with all the notable members of his family (except the Cardinal of Lorraine and the duke of Elbœuf) arrived at Paris. There he received a hero's welcome for his deeds at Vassy. In Paris he met with his supporters the constable, and the marshal St. André. Counter to the Duke's hopes, the Protestant Louis, Prince of Condé was unmoved and did not flee Paris. In response the Duke brought in nearly ten thousand additional horsemen. This show of numbers caused Condé to withdraw to Meaux, where he was soon met by Coligny and D'Andelot.

At this point Antoine of Navarre finally showed his intentions openly by attending Mass on Palm Sunday, March 22, 1562. This caused Catherine de Medici to fear that the Guises would seize the boy King so she made plans to move him to Blois. Antoine refused to allow this as Blois was seen as a center of Protestant activity. The Spanish ambassador also protested this and declared it as evil counsel from L'Hospital. Due to this reaction Catherine moved the King to Fontainebleau. Catherine did not follow the advice of the constable (who may have become resentful of the Guise ascendency). He had called for her to announce the Crown's intention to maintain the Edict of St. Germain and condemn the massacre of Vassy. Instead worrying that a Protestant reaction would only result in the end of the royal Valois dynasty she began to show favor to Spain. Due to the regional structure of the Reformed Church's synods the news of the massacre spread quickly among the Protestants across the provinces. In this manner the news reached Toulouse and Reformed Minister Barrelles informed the congregation from the pulpit.

==== Condé's troops ====
On March 29 the Prince of Condé returned to Paris with Coligny and D'Andelot and three thousand horsemen. All the bridges were drawn up as if the city was under attack. Condé announced it was his intention to enter Paris under arms just as the Duke had done. Not allowed entrance he quartered his troops at St. Cloud and held the highroad from Paris to Orleans at Longjumeau. The purpose of Condé's position was to cut Paris off from Fontainebleau (as Admiral Coligny had moved with forces to Montreuil). In this position, Condé hoped to force the Guises to make a settlement or failing that be able control the Loire and divide France in half (Guyenne, Poitou, and most of Languedoc at his back, where Protestants held increasing political power). Guessing Condé's plans the Guises managed to seize the King and Catherine and move them to Melun which they controlled. In the hands of the Guise, the boy King issued a command that Condé lay down his arms. Condé ignored this order and moved to secure his troops in Orleans. The Guises attempted to prevent this but were foiled by a rapid advance by D'Andelot.

== Burial riot ==
On Thursday April 4, 1562, while still under the toleration established by the edicts, a group of Reformed Church members of Toulouse were accompanying a merchant who belonged to their faith through the Saint-Michel faubourg as he proceeded towards a Reformed Church cemetery to bury his wife. The dead woman's parents and her confessor insisted that she had died a Catholic and that therefore she must be buried in a Catholic cemetery, in ground they held to be holy (holding the Protestant site as "unholy ground"). At the same time a general procession parade of thousands of Catholics was being held for the feast day of Saint-Salvador (the Holy Savior) which was the namesake of one of Toulouse's churches.

Observing the Protestant funeral procession as it passed closer to the seat of Parlement, a number of Catholics refused to let it proceed and then took possession of the body by force. Both sides fell into violent struggle. The tocsin alarm bell was rung out by a priest, with the majority responding being Catholics from the general procession. It was later determined that even priests had disguised themselves so that they could secretly take an active hand in the riot.

A contemporary Reformed Church source recalled "Stones were thrown at the Protestants, and swords were brandished. Many were hurt and several were killed. Amongst the latter were to be found a replacement for a procurator at the Parlement named Vitalis, another called Monsieur de Bazac from Viterbe, Claude Carron, a cloth-finisher, and a student, as well as many others drowned in the sewers."

A contemporary Catholic source, while accusing the Protestants of grave robbing, wrote "the tocsin was sounded and they were greeted on their arrival [at the cemetery] by the noise and clamor of a Catholic mob, amassing from without in great number, heavily armed with whatever their fury had put in their hands: thick ends of sticks, long hatchets, cudgels, long billhooks, forks, spades, slings and stones. They set to work ransacking four heretic houses and ran amok, overturning everything so sadly and horribly, and shamefully to the town". The bloody rioting spread from the faubourg of Saint-Michel into the cathedral quarter of Saint-Etienne and continued throughout the following day. As the riot continued homes were broken into and ransacked for pillage.

Toulouse's Reformed community sought safety by invading and taking over the town hall, the Hôtel de Ville, thus creating a standoff. At first the canons of the cathedral Saint-Etienne stalled any resolution by telling the Parlement that there was nothing serious occurring, but when news of homes being ransacked reached them, a group of parlement judges and capitouls tried to appease the mob by appearing in their red robes of authority. The Catholic mob threw stones and took gun shots at the capitouls while the judges withdrew to the court precincts. According to a contemporary Catholic source, two capitouls named Assézat and Ganelon upon finding the Hôtel de Ville turned into a Protestant fortress returned with 500 armed men. They walked "around with these troops calling on the people at the sound of a trumpet to lay down their weapons on both sides. Returning to the law court these troops found its windows boarded up and, from there, they made a sortie outside the city walls to assail the inhabitants of the suburbs who showed that they lacked nothing in courage, even though they were no match for them in armor. The capitouls were frightened by such opposition and they let these half-crazed butchers...kill some of the more ill-advised and exposed individuals...and in the evening they made their retreat [back into the city]."

A meeting between eight senior judges, four capitouls, the seneschal and the town council were able to determine the terms for a truce.

By the next day, parlement president Jean de Mansencal (whose own son, studying at university, had converted to the Reformed Church) was able to present terms and secure the truce with the Reformed Church members agreeing to disarm and withdraw to the faubourgs. The truce allowed the Reformed Church members to maintain two hundred unarmed guards in line with the Edict of Saint-Germain, the Catholics were allowed a similar number to serve under four professional captains and answer to the capitouls, all other soldiers were forced to withdraw and the ringing of the tocsin upon the Reformed's withdrawal was forbidden.

By the end of the riot many people lay murdered, the majority being Reformed Church members (artisans, students, and legal clerks).

Under the terms of the truce an investigation charged 106 people with incitement, six of which were condemned to death. Ignoring the terms of the truce, the Catholic-dominated Parlement interfered, pardoning all the condemned Catholics, so the only people executed for the riot were four Reformed members hung on April 11 at the four corners of the Place Saint-Georges. The body of the woman over which the riot had begun, had been buried in a Catholic cemetery by priests who helped seize it.

Reformed members saw this pardoning of Catholics who killed Protestants as part of a pattern in the region, a pattern which included the recent shielding of Catholics who had committed the Massacre of Cahors. A contemporary Reformed Church commentator charges conspiracy on the commissioners named Dalzon and de Lozelargie sent to investigate the violence by Parlement. He claimed that the commissioners conferred with the rioting Catholics and while returning to tell Parlement that all was calm, incited violence. He wrote "But in reality they had told them as they left: 'Kill them all; ransack the lot of them. We are your fathers; we will protect you'. This came out afterwards in documentary evidence which, however, was seized and burnt after the entire dissipation of the reformed church [in the city] by those had an interest in covering it all up, even to the extent of executing most of those who had prepared the evidence and those who had been prepared to come forward and give testimony."

=== National events ===
Even as the burial riot went on in Toulouse, outside events continued to encourage hostility between Catholics and members of the Reformed Church. These events would set the stage for larger, deadlier riots in the city.

==== Paris under the Triumvirate ====
On April 5 the constable of Paris had the Reformed Church building at the Port of St. Antoine torn down. Its pulpit, forms, and choir where burnt and pieces of the wreckage carried away as souvenirs by a Catholic mob. Troops were placed on the streets to arrest anyone suspected of being a Protestant and a house to house search was made looking for Protestant preachers. At this time the Guises moved the boy king from Melun to an even stronger fortification at Bois de Vincennes east of Paris. Coligny and D'Andelot offered to meet Catherine to discuss the situation if family members of the Triumvirate went as hostages to Orleans to ensure they were not harmed. The Queen Regent was in agreement, but was overruled by the Triumvirate. At this time it was still hoped that the Council of Trent or a national Council might still bring a peaceful resolution.

The Duke of Guise sent out a letter to the provinces, which claimed to have been directed by the boy King. The letter instructed authorities that they were to disregard the edicts of toleration, claimed that the Protestants wanted to make Condé king. It said that Paris's parlement had declared itself a tutor for the boy King and taken a "resolution to exterminate all those of the Huguenot religion as guilty of divine and human lèse majesté". A copy of the letter reached Toulouse by way of Montpellier on April 10, 1562.

==== Condé's rebellion ====
On April 12, 1562, at Orleans, Condé formally took command of the Protestant soldiers, naming Admiral Coligny and D'Andelot as his lieutenants. They outlawed idolatry, blasphemy, violence, and robbery within the territories under their control. They declared their motive was solely to liberate the boy King from captivity, to punish the insolence of the disloyal and the enemies of the church. The start of the civil war had begun. The Protestants saw their actions as a righteous rebellion from the Guises whom they viewed as usurping tyrants holding the King a prisoner, the Guises saw their opponents as treasonous heretics. Catherine de Medici tried again to broker peace, but neither side was trusting enough to be the first to lay down their arms. By late April, the Guise’s supporters Montmorency and Antoine of Navarre began to waver when they learnt how much territory was under Condé and that troops were moving to Orleans by the thousands. The Duke remained firm, in part because of the question of whether or not the Massacre of Vassy would be attributed to him (neither the Court of the Parlement of Paris nor the peers of France had absolved him of guilt). Further worries resulted due to the Protestant’s position allowing them to intercept most of the attempted communications to the King of Spain. On April 24, the Guises strengthened their position in Paris when the Cardinal of Lorraine brought in another thousand horsemen. That same date a letter was sent to Toulouse authorities from Paris, claiming the Edict of Saint-Germain and its proscribed toleration could never have been valid for the Languedoc region as it was a border province.

==== Appeal to Catholic nations ====
Catherine de Medici continued to fear that Protestant actions would result in the end of the royal dynasty and began to ally with the Triumvirate. Montomrency proposed that she ask the papal nuncio to ask the Pope for money and troops, but Spain was seen as the major Catholic power at this time and so she bid the Triumvirate to ask King Philip II of Spain for assistance. They did so, sending the request with a letter by Antoine of Navarre professing his Catholic faith. On May 8, the boy King Charles IX formally requested military assistance from Spain, Catholic regions of Switzerland, Catholic regions of Germany, Savoy, the Pope, and Catholic princes of Italy.

== Insurrection ==
As outside events added fuel to the flames of sectarian hatred, tensions continued to simmer in Toulouse between the Catholics and Reformed Church members. The capitouls tried to prevent violence by controlling the traffic of weapons into the city, but found it impossible. As historian Mark Greengrass writes, "Monasteries, priests, as well as scholars in the university, maintained caches of small arms and continued to do so, despite the truce. Judges kept garrisons within their private houses and some bourgeois 'monopolisseurs', such as the wealthy Pierre Delpuech, already involved in the arms trade, profited from the additional business that the alarm in the city brought them." In addition the Catholic captains set over the militia by the terms of the truce began to openly defy the capitouls authority over them (as they viewed them as Protestant heretics).

Theodore Beza accompanying Condé in Orleans sent out a letter to the Protestants across the provinces asking for money and arms for their troops. Toulouse responded to the letter by sending funds (though just as in other regions, the amount was not as much as the leadership had hoped). In addition Reformed Church members within Toulouse began to secretly house Protestant troops within their private estates as the beginning of a levy to send on to Orleans.

Perhaps the event that escalated tensions the most was caused by the sénéchal and Parlement who decided that the militia must be reinforced to prevent insurrection. To achieve this they moved to convoke a ban-et-arrière ban which would order all the nearby Catholic nobles to appear in full armor with their warriors. Both Catholic moderates and Protestants within the capitouls protested against the move. They cited the city's charter that forbid armed soldiers from assembling within Toulouse without their permission. The Parlement ignored their protests and on May 10, over two hundred Catholic princes and their retinues entered through the main gate.

As tensions escalated the month-long truce could no longer hold. This resulted in far greater violence than the events of the burial riot with much of it again centering on the Hôtel de Ville.

=== Condé plot ===
Certain that neither justice for their dead nor safety for themselves would be possible under the current political situation, in April Pierre Hunault, sieur de Lanta (one of the Protestant capitouls) veered off his civic trip to Paris and went to Orléans to contact Louis, Prince of Condé. Prince Condé (a convert to the Reformed Church of France and the brother of King Antoine of Navarre) had become the champion of resistance to the domination of the Crown by the staunchly Catholic Guise family. He was seen as a protector of Protestants and had begun to seize and garrison strategic towns along the Loire. Condé told the capitoul to capture Toulouse for the Protestants. The plan was to copy the keys to all the gates of the city's defensive walls and capture the city using the Protestant soldiers already being secretly housed in Toulouse along with troops levied by Lanta from his properties east of the city in Lauragais. The plan would go into effect on May 17 with one of the goals being the strategic seizure of the Hôtel de Ville.

Whether Lanta was ever able to coordinate with Reformed Church members within Toulouse remains unknown, but he did begin to levy troops throughout the villages around his country estate (including Blagnac, Colomiers, and Seilh). Lanata's return and his suspicious activities did not go unnoticed by agents of Blaise de Lasseran-Massencôme, seigneur de Montluc the Catholic military lieutenant in Gascony. Montluc forwarded his suspicions to Mansencal, president of the Parlement of Toulouse, saying that he believed Lanta was set to take the city with 1,200 troops on Pentecost (April 18). The Parlement immediately met in emergency session. Thirty-seven parlementaires signed a document charging over twenty of their colleagues with heresy. Some were viewed as unacceptably moderate (Politiques or Nicodemites), some for being humanists, others on suspicion of Protestant sympathies (not for being Protestants themselves but for allowing their wives or family members to attend Protestant services), still others were viewed as convinced Calvinists. Fully purged, the Parlement issued decrees to counter the planned insurrection by requesting additional military assistance from Anne de Joyeuse to garrison strategic locations in the city including fortifying the Hôtel de Ville. They also discussed how to ban Reformed Church services within the walls of Toulouse.

Becoming aware of Parlement's discussions, the consistory and other notable Reformed Church members of Toulouse quickly held their own meeting. The consistory made up of city notables urged caution hoping to prevent armed strife. The captains wanted to consider practical and realistic objectives given their situation. It was the zeal of Minister Barrelles that carried the day, determining that as troops were already secretly in the city and more were waiting outside that the time to act was upon them. It was judged that Parlement's actions had forced the conspirators hand and an immediate coup was attempted that night – May 12, 1562. Led by some of their capitouls, Reformed Church members at nine p.m. let Captain Saux and some of the Protestant militia in from the suburbs outside the walls through the Porte Villeneuve gate. These troops captured the Hôtel de Ville and took three capitouls prisoner. Protestant forces also captured the three universities and threw up barricades made of dirt filled barrels across the streets leading into the quartiers that they had captured. All of this took place before the dawn of May 13 with little opposition and no bloodshed.

=== Street fighting ===
In light of this treason, the councilors of Parlement passed a sentence of arrest on the magistrates who were taking part. They unilaterally deposed all the capitouls and ordered their property seized. This action was taken, even though only two capitouls were known Reformed members, two had no known previous association with Protestantism (though it is always possible that they converted on the job), and the others were viewed as firm Catholics (but ones who favored moderation and peace). The Parlement bypassed the normal election procedure and appointed a new slate of capitouls, all of whom were staunchly Catholic and at least two of which were members of Toulouse's Catholic syndicat.

While the Hôtel de Ville was held by Reformed Church members, the Catholic faction was led from the nearby seat of Parlement, the Palais de Justice. They turned the chancery of into an operations room, with the rest of the structure serving as a barracks for the Catholic forces. From here they sent forth military commands, such as ordering all removable shop awnings to be taken down to prevent them from being used as Protestant sniper hides. They also commanded all captains and gentlemen in the nearby areas to come and give military assistance.

With both camps entrenched, Parlement quickly had the gunpowder stored in Bazacle Mills seized and requisitioned the King's treasury and any silver within the city. President Mansencal also established a war fund to which all the judges were required to make a contribution. Out in the streets both sides threw up more barricades which soon led to bitter fighting between denominations.

Appearing on the streets of Toulouse in their red robes the councilors of Parlement commanded the populace to take up arms against the members of the Reformed Church. Five or six of their number were dispatched to proclaim to the Catholic citizenry that they should "Pillage, kill boldly, with the approval of the pope, of the king, and of the court." These also gave out "a white cross as a mark of distinction for their persons and houses" to those that answered their call. The Parlement ordered all Catholic combatants to display these crosses on themselves and their homes and decreed that all other Catholics must place a display of lighted candles in their windows. Any qualms that Catholics may have had over killing their neighbors were met with the declaration that such actions were part of a "holy war" and clergy loyal to the Parlement offered dispensation in advance to those who agreed to kill heretics.

Between 3,000 and 8,000 Catholics answered the call and joined in the street fighting. These included the town guard, a supplementary militia of around 400, private troops garrisoned in wealthy homes, and the Catholic knights and their retinues that had responded to the arrière-ban. They were met by around 2,000 Protestants which included the secret levies of militia and bands of students. The Protestants, while woefully outnumbered, were far better armed, having been successfully sneaking weapons and ammunition into the city since the burial riot. They had also confiscated the arsenal at the Hôtel de Ville which included a great number of pikes, armor, arquebuses and cannon. Urban warfare gripped Toulouse and events quickly descended into chaos.

Protestants made use of buildings with overhangs as platforms for musketeers and stone-throwers, they also used their own homes to connect their forces between streets. Catholics often negated these tactical advantages by burning these homes to the ground.

On the 14th, Parlement ordered a purge of its militia forces. Though records do not explain why, two captains professing to be Catholic were slain and two more wounded in the courtyard outside the Palais de Justice. After this purge, their militia focused solely on apprehending people that Parlement suspected of Protestantism.

On the Catholic side all Protestants were viewed in the same light as those holed up in the Hôtel de Ville - being viewed as not only heretics but open traitors. Those not in the Hôtel de Ville were seized in their homes, thrown from windows, or dragged to the Garonne River and thrown in. Even Protestants being taken to prison by town constables were massacred by mobs of angry Catholics. Still the majority of those arrested did make it to prison and the arrests of Protestants were so numerous that those in jail for merely criminal charges but who were not charged with heresy were released to make more room for captured Reformed Church members. Arriving at jail Protestants were stripped, beaten, and males had their beards torn off. When the prisons were filled to capacity, those arrested on suspicion of Protestantism were stripped naked and thrown into the river – those attempting to swim were shot with arquebuses.

As the great number of Reformed Church members in Toulouse were from the higher classes, the hysteria was so out of control that any well-dressed passenger was viewed as a Protestant, taken from the vehicle and slain.

The Reformed Church members focused on Catholic churches and monasteries. In total they captured ten of these types of Catholic buildings, including large monasteries belonging to the Dominican and Franciscan Observantists orders. Monks captured in these raids were taken to the Hôtel de Ville and held prisoner.

Among the fiercest fighters were university students of either denomination. The students were well prepared for guerrilla tactics and street fighting. They were more deadly than even the nobility's armored mounted cavalry forces whose horse-mounted tactics did not transfer well to the narrow streets of Toulouse and whose armor became cumbersome. Much of the violence, especially that performed by members of the Reformed Church took on a ritualistic tone. Catholic churches were ransacked, with statues and other images destroyed. A band of drunken Protestants broke into the parish church of Saint-Georges and destroyed any Catholic statues, paintings, or other imagery. Other Protestants at Saint-Orens mocking the doctrine of Transubstantiation took hold of Sacramental bread prepared for the Catholic Eucharist and defiled it. One account records a Protestant woman at the Église du Taur church defecating on either the Catholic baptismal font, while another source speaks of a woman doing the same upon the altar to show her contempt for the Catholic's sacrifice of the Mass. Catholic items in these churches that they could not manage to destroy (such as the relics/remains of Thomas Aquinas) along with other expensive objects were taken to the Hôtel de Ville. Likewise some of the Catholic actions seem ritualistic as well, with corpses of those deemed heretics denied any sense of a holy burial by being cast in the Garrone River or "mutilated in a systematic fashion." As the riots continued these ritualistic elements faded in the name of efficiency; historian Greengrass describes the scene: "Once the violence became more organized, the ritualistic elements were submerged beneath the familiar elements of civil war...Bodies were dumped in the river Garonne, sewers in the city were scoured out, quartiers were set alight, not as ritual cleansings and purification of the city but as a natural recourse in the strategy of urban warfare when the prisons were full and the sewers offered some refuge. The greater violence perpetrated by the Catholics was not necessarily an expression of their outrage at the desecration of their religious symbols and their failure to find Protestant ritual objects to attack in return; it was the inevitable result of a sectarian conflict in a confined space in which Catholics outnumbered Protestants and had the assistance of professional soldiers to whom killing came easily."

As most of the Catholics in the mob were illiterate and viewed books as a means that spread Protestantism, they were quick to support Parlement's edict to raid booksellers' shops (regardless if they sold Protestant works or not), arrest the bookseller, and then remove all their books and set them on fire in the public gathering places.

As events escalated some in the mobs took advantage of the situation to settle personal scores. Both sides engaged in pillaging homes of their opponents, with even judges, court officials, medical doctors, and lawyers having their homes ransacked. While most of these homes were owned by people suspected of being in the Reformed Church, in some cases the wealthy had their property pillaged even if they were not believed to be Protestants. One such case was Jean de Bernuy who as an ethnic Jew, had come to Toulouse to escape the Spanish Inquisition and made a fortune selling Isatis tinctoria. His elegant townhome was ransacked by a Catholic mob under the baron de Clermont and both of his daughters were raped without anyone ever charging him of Protestantism. His neighbor Mathieu Chauvet was captured and held for ransom. Foreigners and temporary residents were also robbed. Most of the damage to Toulouse was due to this ransacking pillage, with the conservative total estimate being 20,000 écus.

Throughout May 13–14 areas engulfed in street fighting spread to a wider and wider area, moving from around the Place Saint-Georges, to the Place Saint-Sernin, the Porte du Bazâcle, and the streets leading to the cathedral. Greengrass postulates that this closeness to the cathedral and the attacks on the monasteries may be why "the Catholic clergy appeared muted or paralyzed" during these riots, unlike the previous one.

By May 15 the Catholics brought four thick oaken mobile defense structures onto the streets that acted as mobile shields. These structures were mounted on two wheels and were rather large for the streets. By pushing these in front of them the Catholics were able to get close to the enemy with the structure absorbing any weapon's fire. These were successful though the Protestants were able to capture one of them.

Reformed Church members began to utilize the cannons they had won with their capture of the Hôtel de Ville. One was dragged to the Three Pigeons inn and around barricades to halt a Catholic mobile shield, two smaller cannons were moved to the top of the tower in the Collège de Périgord in hopes that they could destroy the spire of the Saint-Sernin (a famous site of Catholic pilgrimage) and thereby control the whole quarter. A last cannon was taken to the top of the Hôtel de Ville itself to shore up defenses.

Also on May 15, Reformed Church members began using the ancient Roman sewer that ran to the Garonne river to move around or to find shelter. Catholics flushed the system with a large amount of water and capturing twenty five Protestants threw them from a bridge into the Garonne river where they drowned.

In the beginning of the riots the Protestants had focused on Catholic ritual objects to vent their anger upon and followed a policy of trying to avoid committing violence on their opponents. Prisoners were treated with consideration, banished rather than executed, and great attempts to convert them to what they deemed true Christianity were made. But as events continued and the situation grew more desperate for them, Protestant policy shifted towards more killing. The Catholic policy remained the same throughout the riots; they deemed Protestants both heretics and traitors who must be exterminated in the name of "holy war". This explains their slaughter of unarmed Protestant prisoners held in the conciergerie and Parlement's prison, and their willingness to hold other Protestants under water till they drowned or watch them burn to death inside their homes.

It is estimated that at least 200 people viewed as Protestants were slain in this street fighting, though some historians (such as Greengrass) hold that such a figure is far too low.

=== Burning of Saint-Georges ===
The Catholics responded to the tactic of Reformed Church members using homes to connect Protestant troops in different streets or as firing platforms by setting those homes on fire.

The members of the Reformed Church throughout the city had around 1,000 troops and "the allegiance of at least one student nation", but promised reinforcements from Protestant noblemen in the region never arrived. In contrast Catholic aristocrat warriors (such as Anne de Joyeuse, Antoine de Lomagne the sieur de Terride, and Monluc) sent troops into the city. In addition every Catholic church within five or six leagues of the town rang out their tocsins, rallying bands of peasantry into the fray.

These superior numbers did not always equate with easy success and more desperate tactics had to be used. Greengrass writes: "Catholics had particular difficulty in the rue des Couteliers and towards the Daurade church, an artisan quarter where Huguenot support was strong. There, Catholics instituted a campaign of terror, sectarian murder, pillage and imprisonment which remind the historian of some of the events [during the St. Bartholomew's Day massacre] in the Quartier Latin in Paris ten years later."

Despite the growing opposition, the Reformed Church members within the Hôtel de Ville were, due to force of arms (which included a cannon), able to hold off the growing opposition.

On Friday, May 15, frustrated by the standoff, the Catholic leadership attempted to dislodge the Reformed Church members, remove cover for any escape route, and end street fighting in that area by setting fire to all Protestant homes in the Saint-Georges quarter (where the Hôtel de Ville was located). The Parlement declared anyone attempting to extinguish the flames would be guilty of a capital offense, which resulted in some Catholic homes burning as well. In the end, more than 200 homes were burnt to the ground.

The Reformed Church members within the Hôtel de Ville continued to hold their position from Monday through Saturday. All talk of truce had been rejected by the zealous minister Barrelles whom had turned the town hall into a Reformed temple. Protestant sources describe him as "courageous and zealous, but very thoughtless and not always inspired by the spirit of God". Even in the midst of the siege he had a vicious argument with a Protestant captain over ransoming captured notables back to the enemy. In the end he had the captain thrown into the Hôtel de Ville prison as well. Still, with the city around him ablaze, even he could not long ignore the reality of their military situation.

=== Truce ===
As the riots continued throughout the week some of the city's notables sought to avoid the conflict or find a way to end it as peacefully as possible. Several of Toulouse's magistrates were determined to remain neutral while both sides descended into bloodshed. Many left the city or moved to quieter areas within it (occasionally sending out attempts to see if Reformed friends or family members and their homes were safe), other notables stayed within their properties protected by a heavy guard. Those under their own guard were viewed with suspicion by the Catholic faction, and proposals to invoke their aid where rejected by the Catholic syndicat. The viguier (a type of judge) named Jean Portal attempted to remain neutral on his garrisoned property near the Palais de Justice, but his doors were torn down and he was seized by a Catholic mob who suspected him of Protestantism.

On the Catholic side, many of the nobles, who had responded to the ban and arrière-ban, were appalled at the cost the Protestant resistance and their tactics of urban warfare was having on their armored troops. Catholic Captain Ricaud was so devastated at the loss of so many of his troops within just two days of fighting that he withdrew to an Augustinian monastery, refused all food and drink, and wailed about the great loss of gens de bien (good/honest folk). The nobles were also dismayed that the Protestants had no respect for the status of their bloodlines and casualties among the gentry were high. One Catholic noble was even thrown by Protestant townsfolk into the river weighted down by his gilded armor.

Among the Protestants, Captain Sauxenes grew ever more dismayed at the carnage. He began to release some of the Catholic notables that had been taken prisoner (especially the women and children). For these actions he was accused of treason by the zealous Minister Barrelles.

On May 14, private contacts between factions led to an attempt at negotiations over the barricades at Saint-Rome between Captain Saux and Pierre Delpuech but they fell flat. Nothing was achieved until Saturday May 16, after six hours of early morning fighting and parlement judge Antoine de Resseguier using his skills as a mediator. The Reformed's Captain Saux reached an agreement with the captain of the Catholic troops and Catholic nobleman Raymond de Pavia baron de Fourquevaux of Narbonne. A truce lasting until Sunday night would be called allowing the Protestants to leave Toulouse, never to return. Nothing was laid out about the Protestants' possessions or their worship. Toulouse's capitouls joined a number of Catholic notables after Saturday evening Mass at a Carmelite Church to hastily ratify the terms. News of the terms spread and situational details were negotiated over each barricade.

== Massacre ==
Even before the riots there had been a shortage of grain supplies throughout the town, and as the days of rioting stretched on, the Reformed Church members (within the Hôtel de Ville and strongholds in the university colleges) began to run out of food even for the women and children that had joined them there. This presence of refugees is also believed to have hindered their military (estimates put the number of refugees as already over two thousand by Thursday). The Protestants had never been able to control the river and so were cut off from both the mills alongside it and receiving supplies through it. They did capture some stores from the monasteries, but these were also quickly exhausted.

The Reformed Church members' strategic position in the town had always been weak. The expected outside reinforcements of de Lanta, d'Arpajon and other Protestant nobles from Guyenne and the Albigeois never reached the city, having been blocked by royal troops under orders of Blaise de Lasseran-Massencôme, seigneur de Montluc the provincial lieutenant. A few reinforcements did arrive from the Lauragais and Pamiers on Friday and entered through the few gates that the Protestants held, but their numbers and training were inferior to the troops of the Catholic nobility that had answered the ban and arrière-ban. The morale of the Reformed Church members quickly sank when they realized that there was little hope of additional reinforcements. Relying heavily on their captured cannons and having failed to capture the eighteen casks of powder and mills at the Porte du Bazâcle, their military supplies of gunpowder were soon as scarce as their food supplies.

The Governor of Narbonne was sent by the Parlement of Toulouse to discuss the peace terms with those inside the Hôtel de Ville. The Reformed Church members agreed to leave the Hôtel and their other strongholds, abandon their arms and possessions inside, and leave Toulouse forever under the promise that they would be unmolested. As Saturday night fell, starting between eight and nine p.m. the Reformed Church members in large numbers began to file through the only Protestant-controlled exit from the walled city, the gate of Villeneuve. Some of their number watched from the rooftop of the Hôtel, singing Protestant hymns to their departing fellows.

With only the gate of Villeneuve being seen as a safe passage through the city walls, and with the number of Protestant refugees so large and progressing so slowly (due to carrying possessions and family members), the exodus from Toulouse lasted throughout Saturday night and all the way past eight p.m. Sunday night.

As that Sunday was Pentecost, the Reformed Church members within the Hôtel de Ville held a Lord's Supper service and with prayers and tears began leaving its safety defiantly singing Psalms in French. They were accompanied by the town trumpeter who had climbed the Hôtel's tower and played psalms and hymns which were heard throughout the city. It was hoped that as it was Pentecost around the time of vespers, the majority of the Catholic population would be at their Benediction of the Blessed Sacrament. The Catholic leadership had ordered the city watch to supervise the truce from the Church towers, and it was hoped that they could maintain discipline over their co-religionists.

The historian G. de Felice charges that corrupt clergy members had instructed their listeners that the Catholic Church's teaching of juramentum contra utilitatem ecclesiasticam prœstitum non tenet ("No oath contrary to ecclesiastical utility [the interests of the Church] is binding"), meant that any promise to someone deemed a heretic did not have to be upheld. In any event, the promise of safety was not upheld – those who had abandoned their weapons and left the Hôtel de Ville were soon met by an angry Catholic mob.

As soon as the last detachment of Reformed Church members had left the protection of the walls around the Hôtel and made their way towards the gate of Villeneuve, tocsin bells began to ring out. Large mobs of angry Catholics ran out of their churches, seized their weapons and began to chase down and massacre unarmed Protestant men, women, and children. Reformed Church members had to run a gauntlet of Catholics intent on killing and screaming for Protestant blood along with cries of Vive la Croix! ("Long live the Cross"). In addition to the swarming mobs chasing them through the town, the unarmed Reformed Church members were also met outside the walls by Catholics who had forced a violation of the truce by ordering city guards at gunpoint to open another gate so they could intercept the fleeing Protestants.

The peasants from nearby villages up to ten miles away that had responded to calls of help from the Parlement earlier in the week, having no training with firearms, had remained outside the city. As they had been told that it was not only permitted but honorable to kill any Protestant on sight and pillage their goods, a thousand such peasants intercepted and slaughtered many trying to flee to Protestant-friendly towns. Outside the confines of Toulouse (which had allowed the Protestants to use urban terrain and tactics to withstand the overwhelming number of Catholics and negate the advantage of mounted armored knights), even if they had been armed they would have had no chance in the plat pays (flat places) that lay between them and Protestant friendly towns. No town not dominated by Protestants could be seen as safe for them; even those who had disguised themselves as peasants from the fields, or as priests trying to pass through Lavaur (to get to Montauban), were found out and slaughtered.

Inside Toulouse revenge killings continued. Blaise de Lasseran-Massencôme, seigneur de Montluc, having been barraged with pleas from Parlement arrived there with his forces the day after the insurrection had ended. In his writings Montluc reports that up to 400 Protestants were slain, by his own armored and mounted troops and by mobs of Catholic peasants, while trying to escape Toulouse.

Many bodies of those slain outside the walls would lay there half-eaten on the roadsides until identified and collected by the capitaine de la santé.

All contemporary sources hold that more were slain outside the walls than in the streets of Toulouse. It is estimated that around 3,000 to 5,000 people had died in the combined rioting and massacre, with the vast majority being Protestants.

== Trials ==
Throughout the day after the massacre, even with the insurrection crushed, a feeling of hysteria continued to grip Toulouse. Property and homes continued to be ransacked, while the town guard continued to pursue those suspected of Protestantism. Even those who had remained uncommitted could come under suspicion depending on what side of the barricades they were found on, or which friends they had visited the night of May 12. The Parlement soon produced lists of suspects and those who had shown a lack of Catholic commitment were shown a lack of mercy by town officials.

Soon after, Parlement began inquires on the events. Those Protestants that constables had managed to bring to prisons alive were summarily judged by the Parlement and found guilty of capital offenses save for a handful of cases. Investigations soon expanded to seek out those who might have secretly supported the coup and those who might be secret heretics. Between two and three hundred were publicly executed for heresy and the town's provost Captain Saux (a leading Reformed Church member whom had survived the riots) was quartered. Another four hundred were executed for contumacy. Around two hundred were burnt in effigy. In the end nearly a thousand people were investigated by the Parlement.

Confiscations of property for those the Parlement declared had taken part in the attempted coup were widespread, and accusations have been made that witnesses were bribed or threatened with "ecclesiastical menaces" to increase this property forfeiture. (Felice states: "The clergy had published a motion enjoining, under pain of excommunication and eternal damnation, not only the denunciation of heretics, but even of those, who had given them counsel, help, or favor.")

Such a situation caused abuses, one of the more outrageous included the hanging of a twelve-year-old boy who had arrived from Montauban, the Parlement had declared him a heretic for being unable to recite the Ave Maria, despite his protest that he hadn't been taught it yet.

Other than the fate of a group of Augustinian nuns (who had abandoned their cloister in order to return to the world to get married and were sentenced to whipping plus three years of imprisonment), little is known about the fate of women during these trials as it was assumed that they were merely following the wills of their husbands.

The Parlement had the decree issued on the first day of the insurrection, which had stripped the capitouls of their offices and seized their property, inscribed into a marble slab and placed at Toulouse's Hôtel de Ville.

According to city records, the Parlement of Toulouse made the city 22,236 livres tournois from sales of property confiscated from those it found guilty of heresy or contumacy from 1562 to 1563.

== Aftermath ==
Historian Joan Davies relates to what lengths the Protestants of Toulouse had to face in order to worship according to their beliefs, writing "Under the terms of the peace of Amboise, March 1563, the Protestants of Toulouse no longer had the right to worship in their own city but were assigned a lieu du culte first at Grenade, then Villemur, both over twenty kilometers away. There is no evidence that they retained the service of a pastor, but a consistory was still active in 1564, hoping to reconstitute the church. By September 1567, those who wished to attend the cêne had to travel to Montauban; in 1572, Toulousain Protestants can be found at Villemur and trying to worship at Castanet, just outside the city, where the seigneur claimed the right to hold services."

The famous Reformed theologian Pierre Viret had been working in southeast France (Nîmes, Montpellier, and Lyons) beginning in 1561, he had intended to go to Toulouse in March 1563 but upon hearing of the riots, he returned to Protestant-dominated Lyon after touring Languedoc and the Dauphiné. As the Wars of Religion continued, Pierre d'Airebondouze in Geneva was asked to convey a message to Calvin by Viret. He had been contacted by an official from Toulouse claiming he could raise between three and four thousand Protestant soldiers in the surrounding region of Languedoc if rich fugitives from Toulouse would contribute funds. Viret had secured promises of funds from the Toulousain refugees in Lyon, but many had soon after fled to Geneva following a Protestant defeat near their new home.

Following the riots the populace of Toulouse became well trained in the methods of organized confessional militancy. In 1563 the Catholic populace was called by the Parlement to enroll in leagues dedicated to preserving the religious purity of France. These people were led by Catholic warriors from the nobility, ranking members of the Catholic hierarchy, and city officials. Members were to mark their homes and clothing with white crosses. All who joined "of whatever dignity" had to take an oath to preserve the state religion. Anyone league members encountered who refused to take the oath was to "be considered rebels". This practice was reinvigorated in 1568 reformed with the title "crusade" rather than league. Toulouse's "crusade" received a papal bull of approval in March 1568. This group was later folded into the Catholic League that formed in 1576 with the express intention of preventing the Protestant Henry of Navarre from becoming King.

Historian Gayle K. Brunelle states that "As a result [of the city's experience during the 1562 Protestant uprising], not only was Toulouse one of the earliest cities to support the Catholic League, but the Parlement and the city government, cleansed of Protestants, hunted sorcerers and heretics with a relentless, almost obsessive, ferocity until the end of the sixteenth century." As the capitouls had been purged of those tolerant of Protestants and replaced with members whose Catholicism was beyond question, the only opposition to a tendency towards ultra-Catholicism in the city's leadership was from a faction of magistrates in Parlement who favored moderation. Even this faction occasionally came under suspicion seen as being Nicodemite.

=== Later persecutions ===
As the Wars of Religion engulfed the country, the member of the Reformed Church in Toulouse that had survived the events of 1562 continued to face persecution. Historian Mark Greengrass states, "The opening of each new phase of the civil wars was marked by another wave of repression of rebels and heretics in which the memories of the 'impious and unhappy civil war' of 1562 formed a powerful stimulus".

In 1568 between four and five hundred were slain in the night and their bodies thrown into the Garonne river. In addition to the night pogrom, sixteen members high officers (including many from Parlement) were placed under arrest for suspicion of heresy, while sixteen more fled to Montauban and Castres.

In 1572, in reaction to the St. Bartholomew's Day massacre in Paris, Toulouse officials ordered all suspected Reformed Church members to be placed in confinement (some held within Catholic convents, others in the municipal prison). On the night of October 3 (over a month after the Paris massacre) two merchants (father and son) named Delpeche arrived from Paris. They claimed they had orders "to kill all" Protestants. As evening progressed the Delpeches gained supporters and these self-appointed executioners took the Reformed Church members from their cells and murdered them. Between 200 and 300 Reformed Church members were slain in this manner. Among those killed were three councilors of the Parlement whose bodies, draped in their official robes, were hung from a tall tree in front of the seat of Parlement. Among those slain was Jean de Coras. Unlike other areas of France which responded with mob violence and indiscriminate killing, Toulouse's response to the St. Bartholomew's Day massacre was cold, efficient, and systematic. With knowledge of the killings, many surviving Toulousain Protestants (like others throughout France) abandoned their faith through abjuration at this time.

By 1762 Toulouse's treatment of Protestants was met with some outrage over its execution of Jean Calas by breaking at the wheel.

=== Annual festival ===
In celebration of their victory over a Protestant coup, the Parlement of Toulouse created an annual festival (fête) for "The Deliverance" to be held every May 17. Pope Pius IV issued a papal bull approving of the religious ceremony and attaching indulgences and benediction to it. As the Wars of Religion dragged on, interest in the celebration began to wane in the late 1580s; supporters of the Catholic League were successful in reinvigorating the annual procession to celebrate the city's "liberation". The fete for the city's "deliverance" became one of the longest continual ceremonies in all of Old Regime France – being annually celebrated from 1563 to 1791, with the official orders of Toulouse assembling each May 17 for a solemn general procession.

==== The 200th anniversary ====
The Fête was the largest of Toulouse's general processions and the celebration of its 200th anniversary was (as historian Robert A. Schneider states) "one of the great moments in Toulouse's history, commemorating the two-hundredth anniversary of this glorious event. It was a lavish spectacle, attracting...thirty thousand tourists and pilgrims. And its popularity was enhanced by the renewal of a papal bull originally issued in 1564 granting faithful indulgences for attending prayers at either the cathedral or the Basilica Saint-Sernin."

A fireworks display was offered held on scaffolding set up to look like a temple. Several items on the scaffolding recalled the triumph of the Catholics over the Protestants 200 years before. One inscription stated "Religion graced and defended this place with its illustrious and precious blood. It is here that faith triumphed wondrously. Calvin, seeing this, shuddered. ...The relics of the saints are Toulouse's honor." Higher up the scaffolding another inscription stated "The Faithful believer will find here his only entrance. ...Harmony and peace reign in this place. ...Those who are excluded perish without help. ...This way, and by no other, one ascends to heaven." Over the inscription of the word "Religion" a statue personifying it held a chalice in one hand, a cross in the other, and crushed under its feet a prostrate figure of Calvin. After being postponed by rain the fireworks were set off on May 17.

Still outraged over Toulouse's execution of Jean Calas just months before, the whole celebration was seen with particular disgust by the Enlightenment writer Voltaire, who called it "the procession to thank God for four thousand murders."
