= Capitoul =

Former ruling council of Toulouse, France

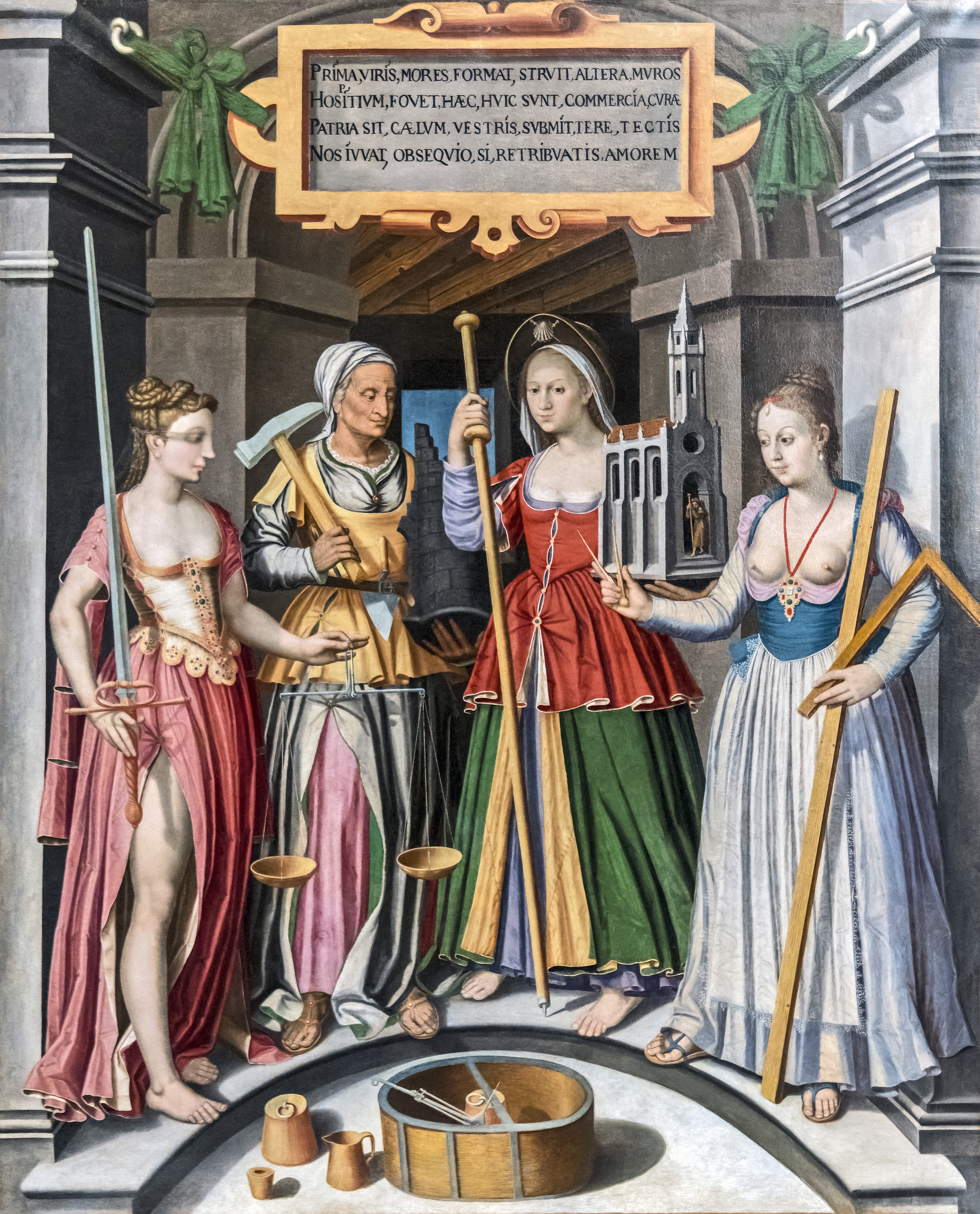
Arnaut Arnaut's c. 1590 Four Functions of the Toulousian Capitoulate. From left to right: justice, trade, church, and construction.

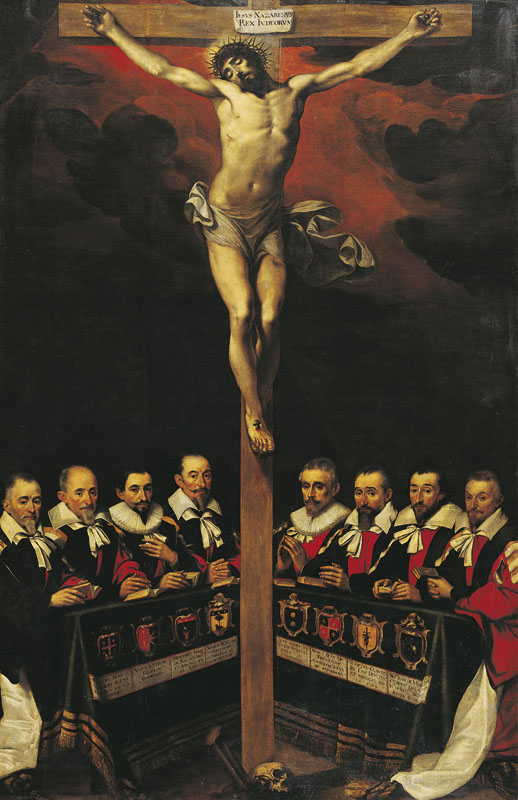
Portrait of the Capitouls Named by Writ of Parliament, 28 November 1622, by Jean Chalette.

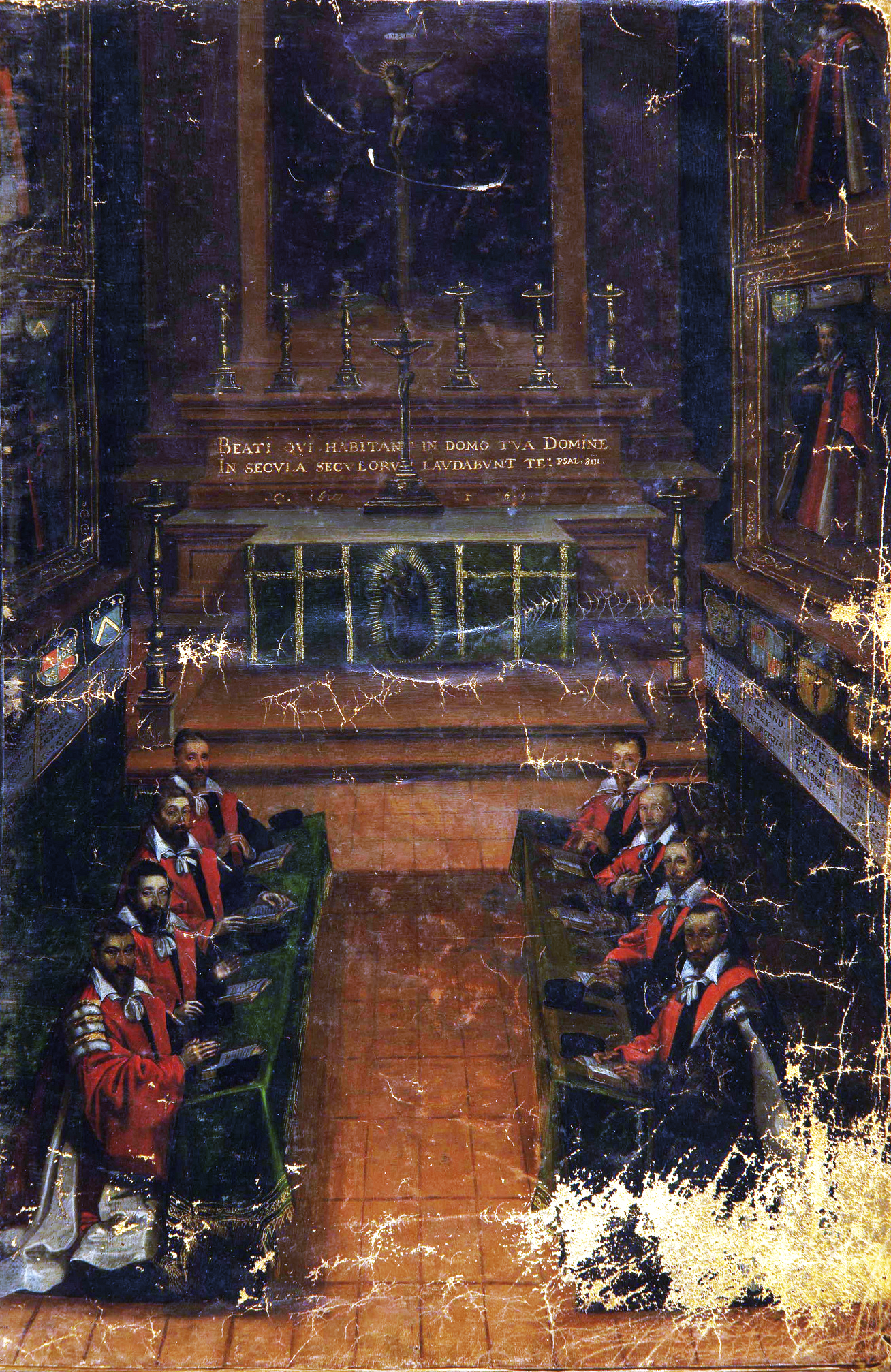
The eight capitouls for 1618, painted in the Capitol's chapel.

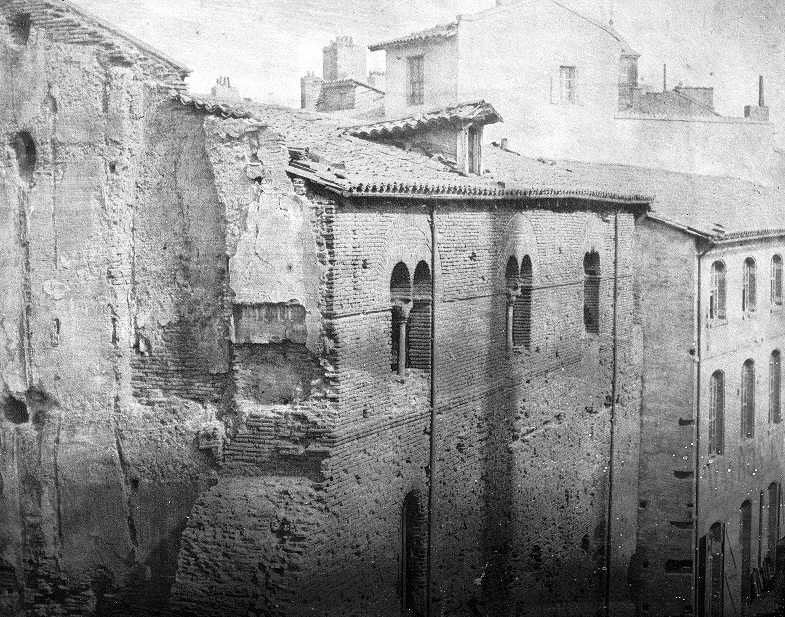
The Chateau Narbonnais in the 19th century.

The capitouls, sometimes anglicized as capitols which is also the Occitan and Catalan word, were the chief magistrates of the commune of Toulouse, France, during the late Middle Ages and early Modern period. Their council and rule was known as the Capitoulate (French: capitoulat). They were suppressed in 1789 amid the French Revolution.

== Name ==
The officials were originally known as consuls (consules) but were christened "capitouls" in 1295 as part of an effort to connect Toulouse with the greatness of such cities as Rome, Constantinople, and Jerusalem.

== Rival councils ==
In addition to the Capitoulate, Toulouse housed the rival Parliament, General Council, Town Council, and Council of Sixteen. Each included the reigning capitouls, but only as associate or junior members.

The Parlement of Toulouse (French: parlement de Toulouse) was established by King Charles VII in 1420 and put on a permanent basis in 1444. It was nominally restricted to the nobility, although positions could be purchased via an annual fee known as the paulette. Members (parlementaires) were exempt from gabelles, city property taxes, and tithes; exempt from billeting of troops; and exempt from any legal proceeding except those within the Parliament itself. It also served as a bastion of Catholicism and, after 1548, was charged with operating the town's chambre ardente, which persecuted Protestant "heretics". It also built up an influential body of lawyers (procureurs and advocats) around its operations.

The General or Common Council (counseil général) was formed of a large body of notables, including representatives of the Catholic archdiocese, the major local chapters, and university, several lawyers, townsmen, and the present and former capitouls. In the 16th century, this made up almost eighty men but this changed over time: by the 17th century, the church and tradesmen had been almost removed from representation. Meanwhile, the Parliament went from having no representation in 1550 to eight members including the First President in 1556 to being forbidden to meet without the members of Parliament present in 1578. It was thenceforth usually directed by the First President of the Parliament. A remnant of the medieval commune's general assemblies, it was typically limited to ceremonial hearings and oversight of the capitulary election. It was restructured and given greater importance during the 1778 reform of Toulouse's civic government.

The Town Council (counseil des bourgeoisie) was a smaller number of townsmen and capitouls who met more often to oversee the Capitoulate.

The Council of Sixteen (counseil des seize) was formed of the present year's eight capitouls and the previous year's eight as well. It also met regularly in the 16th century.

== Election ==
The capitouls were elected annually from the city's eight districts, also called "capitoulates". (Note: The character of these districts was maintained through parish festivals (fénétras) and their rivalry expressed through contests between local gangs of apprentices.) Between the 14th and late 17th centuries, the election of the capitouls took place in November and December of each year. On November 23, each outgoing capitoul proposed six candidates. An assembly of former office holders halved this list to 24. The town's viguier and seneschal then selected the eight who took their oath of office on December 13. Backroom negotiation and bribery were commonplace. (Note: One failed applicant even took his case to the regional parliament, being literally laughed out of court when he tearfully complained that his 4000 livres in bribes had brought him nothing.) Following the 1562 riots, the elections were closely controlled by the Parliament and in 1661 Louis XIV's appointee Gaspard de Fieubet secured the perpetual right to name the capitouls from his position as First President of the Parliament.

In 1683, the king began to appoint the capitouls from a slate of candidates provided by the city. By 1701, the position was broadly venal, with prospective capitouls required to provide loans of at least 10,000 livres to the city upon their "election"; in 1734, a royal edict made four of the positions explicitly venal, "commissioned" offices that were purchased from the king. Another edict in 1746 established eight permanent "titular" (titulaire) capitouls, pairs of which rotated in office each year with the six other capitouls, which were "elected" by the king from the town's slate of nominees.

== History ==
The Toulousians claimed that their liberties predated the Kingdom of France, having been bestowed by the Roman emperor Theodosius I, and that the capitouls represented a direct continuation of the consuls of the Roman Republic. The town annals described their dignity as arising from "halting their own business, suspending their commerce, abandoning all particular affectations and putting aside their cherished projects in order to augment the Republic, following the precepts of Plato, Aristotle, Xenophon and other philosophers." (Note: ACT, cited in Schneider.) In fact, the municipal government of Toulouse grew from the assembly permitted by Count Raymond V in 1152. His successors confirmed the council and permitted the open election of its members by the town's citizens. Any free citizen over 25 was eligible. (Note: Citizenship was conferred if a man served in the town's militia, paid its taxes, vowed to obey its laws and customs, and stated "I wish to enter Toulouse and to be made a citizen of Toulouse" (Latin: Ego volo intrare Tholosam et facere me civem Tholose).)

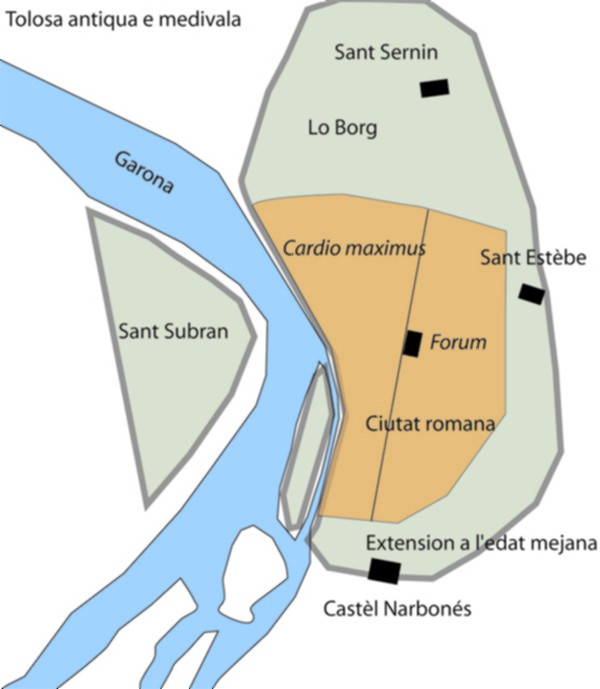
The city and borough of medieval Toulouse

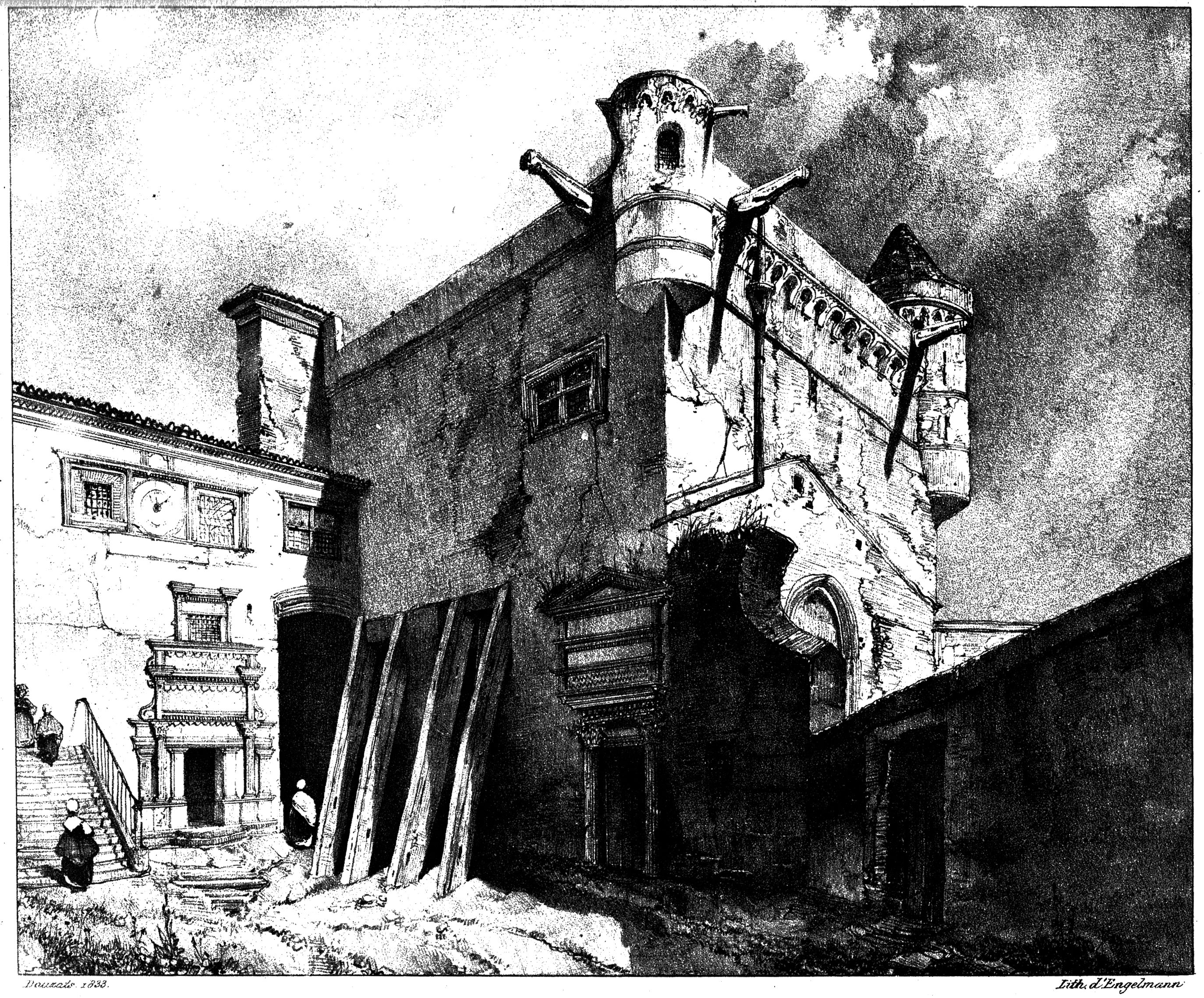
The medieval donjon of the Capitole de Toulouse in the 19th century.

Initially, the council consisted of six men from the city (cité) of Toulouse proper, bound by its old Roman walls, and six from the borough (bourg) of tradesmen which had developed around St-Sernin. After the 1215 union of these two settlements, the twelve positions were divided among twelve capitoulates, six in each half. The districts of the old city were La Daurade, the Old Bridge (Le Pont-Vieux), and La Dalbade near the Garonne; St-Étienne around the bishop's cathedral; St-Pierre & St-Géraud around the count's palace; and St-Romain around the town hall. Those in the borough were named for the church of St-Pierre-des-Cuisines and for their adjacent gates into the old town: Arnaud Bernard, Las Crosses, Matabovis, Pousonville, and Villeneuve.

The commune received many privileges from its counts during the 12th century: its capitouls formed the city's principal court, (Note: See Turning for various examples of the town's legal code during this era.) established market rules and tax exemptions, and maintained the town's drainage. Even the counts' vicars occasionally submitted to the Capitoulate's jurisdiction. Most of these powers were lost following the Albigensian Crusade against the Cathars in the 13th century, particularly after the ascension of the Capetian Alphonse of Poitiers as count of Toulouse and his succession by King Philip, who imposed seneschals over his new territories. The election procedure was revamped by King Philip III in 1283, when he provided that each outgoing capitoul was to provide a list of three potential replacements to the seneschal, who would choose one or—in the event he disapproved of them all—nominate his own man. The new capitouls were then to swear their vows and pledge loyalty to the king on the steps of the old comital palace.

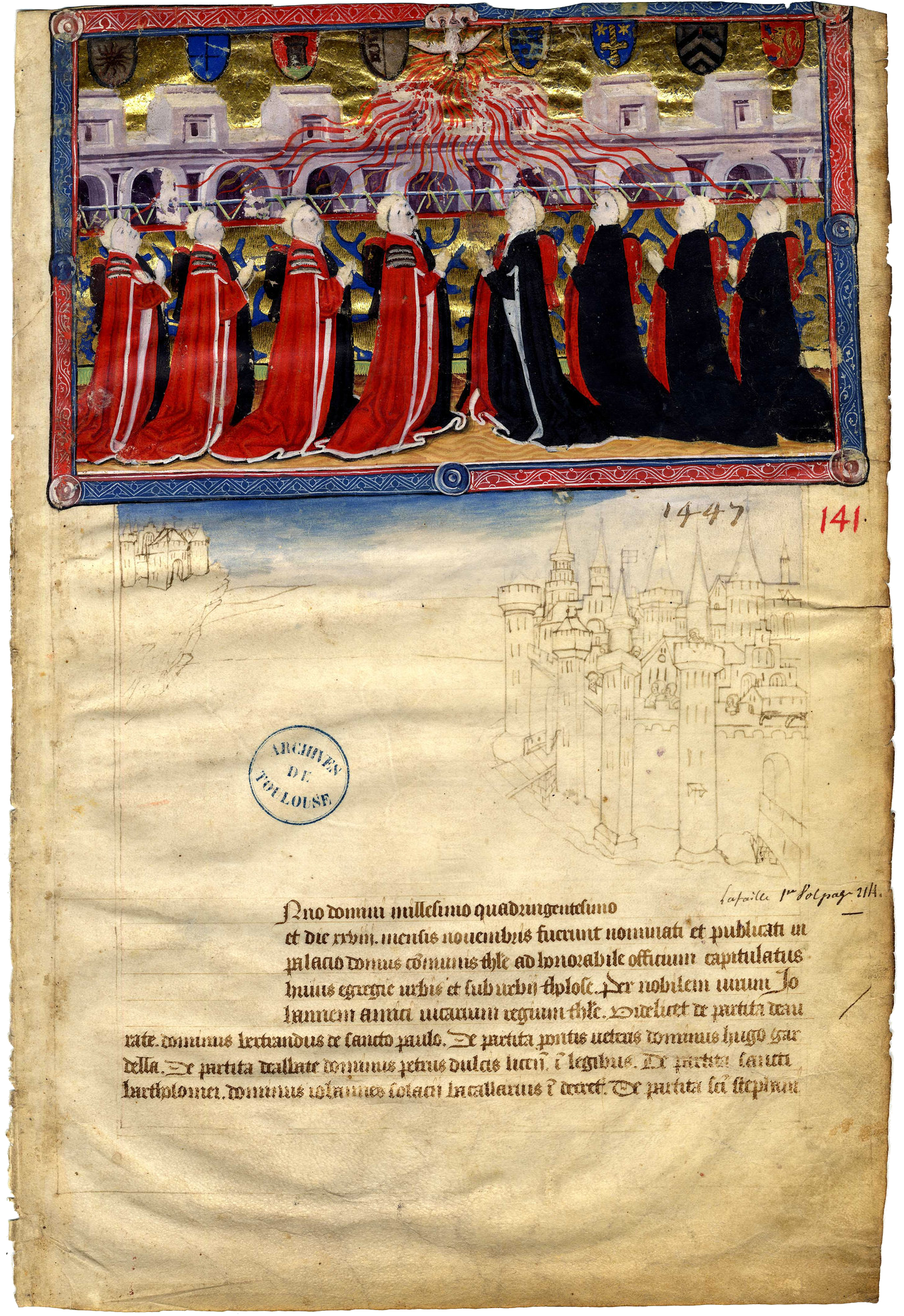
The municipal annal for 1453, including a portrait of the year's capitouls, their coats of arms, and the dove of the Holy Spirit inspiring them. Below, a sketch of medieval Toulouse.

The Capetians accepted the need to preserve some local traditions, (Note: Berman, cited in Turning.) and the capitouls were charged with presenting lists of Toulouse's privileges and laws, which the king then accepted or rejected. The town's new charter preserved the right for citizens to elect a town council of 24 "capitouls"; this number was subsequently reduced to eight by the 15th century. Major decisions of the town—including legal and economic questions—were decided by the Capitoulate, as well as the patronage attendant on their control of more than a hundred civic positions. In the late 13th century, the capitouls regulated the town's guilds, with the power to nominate and depose their bailiffs. They also directed the town's 400 or so ward heelers (dizainiers). In October 1283, Philip III accepted that the capitouls would administer civil justice within the city and its surrounding seneschalty; questions of canon law continued to be determined by the bishop's court (Note: In practice, the ecclesiastical court at Toulouse was lenient even to homicidal monks and university students, who enjoyed clerical status. The seneschal began arresting clerics found bearing illegal weapons and in 1275 was empowered by the regional parliament with sole authority over the determination of an accused's clerical status and given the ability to enforce canon law in his own right. The king did not nullify these provisions until 1289, restoring the bishop's jurisdiction with stern injunctions for him to pursue malefactors. By 1292, the frustration at being forced to release criminals in lay garb upon their own claims of clerical status and at being forced by royal order—against the town's own traditions since the 12th century—to observe asylum even in the case of murderers and thieves led the bishop to complain that the seneschal and capitouls were arresting clerics indiscriminately, torturing them in the town hall, and then throwing them into the Garonne at night.) and some oversight was given to the king's seneschal, but the capitouls' deliberations were normally free of interference by the king's judges. They secured the city's grain supply, which frequently brought them into conflict with the large landowners represented in the Toulouse Parliament. The capitouls also purchased freedom from royal taxation and an exemption from royal garrisons within the town walls, liberties confirmed by Charles VIII in 1495. They participated in the city's general processions, mass parades through the town organized for the high holy days, various civic occasions, and at times of collective danger. The outgoing capitouls were also responsible for drafting the town annals (annales manuscrits de la ville), an account of municipal affairs during their year in office. These records, also known as the Twelve Books (Douze Livres), began their first entry—that for the year 1296—with a Latin poem translated in Turning as: (Note: The original is now lost but, according to Roschach, was preserved in a French translation in the records of an 18th-century court case.)

Toulouse was free, with full rights, and will be without end;
If she is just and pious, she will be forever populous.
Toulouse is proud of its twelve consuls
Who govern her, fair, pious, and powerful.

As the office was ennobling after 1459, it was attractive to many of the city's middle and lower upper class. The Capitoulate was closed to the king's officers and, while it was intended to represent the city's nobles, lawyers, and merchants, in practice the merchants were largely shut out of office after the mid-16th century. The trappings of nobility enjoyed by the capitouls included a red and black silk ermine gown (Note: The robes were purchased for the capitouls by the city at a cost of 300 livres each.) and exemption from prosecution for both the office holder and his son.

In the early 16th century, the Capitoulate curtailed prostitution, oversaw poor relief, organized the local militia into a permanent force, established a health board to fight plague outbreaks, and directed rebuilding from the devastation of the Hundred Years' War and a massive fire in 1463. In 1505, they took the town's nine hospitals out of church hands and placed them under a single civil administration. In 1514, they opened another hospital, the St-Sebastian, to quarantine and care for plague victims. In 1518 and 1519, the town's archives were recopied and preserved.

A new bridge was thrown across the Garonne and the Hôtel de Ville completely refurbished.

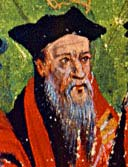
A 1562 portrait of the capitoul Jean Alies in his robes of office.

Several royal edicts confirmed the Capitoulate's jurisdiction and, in 1554, they won the right to oversee all cases of heresy within the city walls. However, during an outbreak of plague in 1557, the Parliament interfered with the regular method of electing capitouls, causing much resentment. By 1561, nearly every aspect of municipal government—revenue, expenditure, administration, education, and defense—was disputed between the two bodies. A shortfall owing to war taxes and the town's firma burgi led to rival proposals to sell Catholic or Protestant church properties. To reduce the Parliament's power, the capitouls ended lifetime positions in the municipal government, opening them all to annual election. In 1562, the first year, many of these went to members of the Reformed Church. The Reformers also held a majority of that year's seats on the town council. The attempt of the capitoul Pierre Hunault, sieur de Lanta, to seize the Hôtel de Ville and inner city set off the 1562 Toulouse Riots, whose aftermath saw the entire slate of elected capitouls replaced by a Catholic gang named by the Toulouse Parliament.

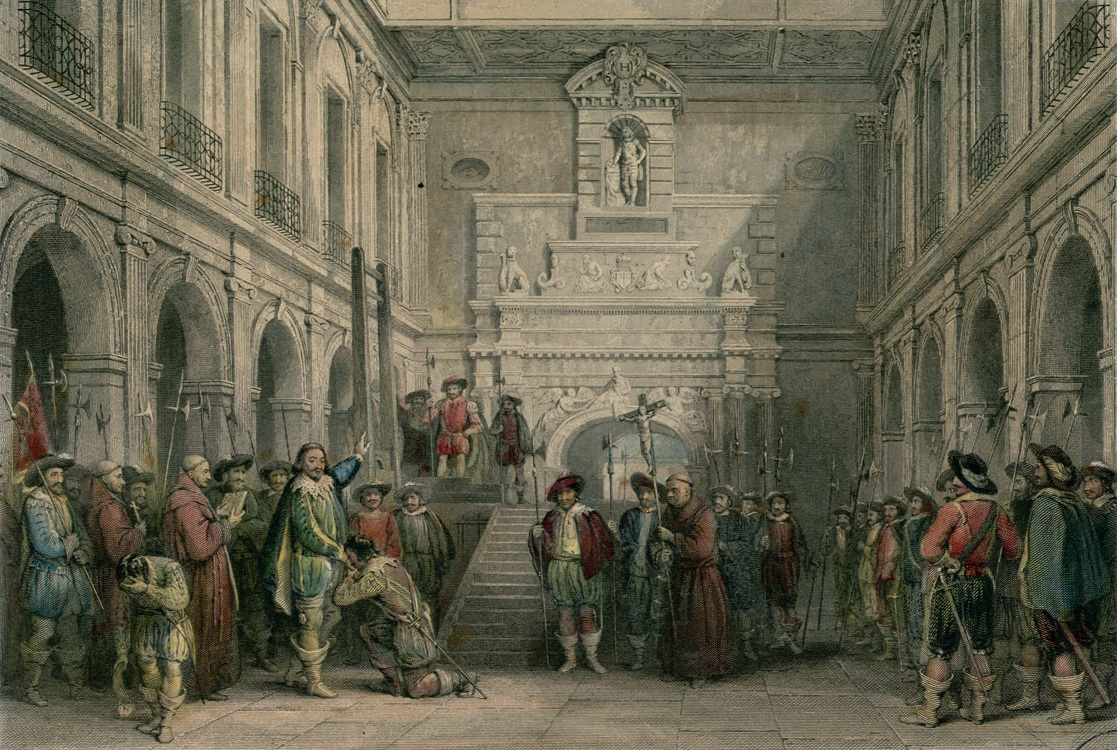
C.J. Delille's c. 1840 print of the execution of the Duke of Montmorency at the Capitole de Toulouse on 30 October 1632.

The town annals subsequently cease to speak of the town's "municipal republic" and Parliament generally increased its control over the city thereafter. In 1578, the capitouls were forbidden to appear before the members of Parliament in the town's general processions. During a "shoving match" over which body should stand beside the eucharist during the Pentecostal procession of 1597, the capitouls were "manhandled, thrown onto the ground, and trampled". (Note: Lafaille, cited in Schneider.) The capitouls were placed in inferior positions at official functions: in 1644, a reviewing stand was demolished because it did not permit sufficient distance between the members of Parliament and the capitouls. At the death of Archbishop Montchal in 1651, the capitouls were even forbidden from any participation in his funeral. Individual members of Parliament also regularly made a point of insulting the capitouls at public and private functions.

In the mid-17th century, Cardinal Mazarin and King Louis XIV briefly restored much of the Capitoulate's autonomy, even giving it the right to take some cases to the Parliament of Bordeaux rather than its local rivals, as part of an attempt to secure its alliance during the Fronde uprising. After the restoration of order, however, the First President of the Parliament, Gaspard de Fieubet, was able to use his connections to the royal court to first name his lackeys as the capitouls for 1660 and then, in 1661, to directly appoint the annual capitouls in perpetuity.

As Intendant of Languedoc, Nicolas de Lamoignon placed his own men as capitouls and oversaw an overhaul of Toulouse's municipal government in the 1680s and '90s. He noted that prior to his actions each capitoul routinely apportioned the town's alms "to his shoemaker, to his baker, and to other artisans, while the true poor receive nothing"; (Note: Lamoignon, cited in Schneider.) that they shirked responsibilities such as policing that offered little personal honor; and that they underpaid Toulouse's contribution to the taille and forced the city into indebtedness by exempting themselves and friends from local taxation. His changes functioned briefly but floundered: His independent police lieutenant was purchased by the city in 1699 for 220,000 livres (Note: Despite greatly increasing local indebtedness, the creation of such offices in fact turned into an important source of revenue for Louis XIV and XV, as the local government was obliged to pay enormous sums to restore their control over them.) and he was obliged to accept the practice of hiring capitouls who were willing to supplement the city's funds with personal loans, as with those who assisted in making up for a grain shortage around 1710. Subsequent intendants were similarly forced to accept nominees of the archbishop, the parliamentary presidents, and other important nobles of the realm, even when such candidates did not so much as visit the city, let alone perform the responsibilities of their office.

The capitouls were present at the laying of the foundation stone of the Garonne lock of the Canal du Midi near Toulouse in November, 1667.

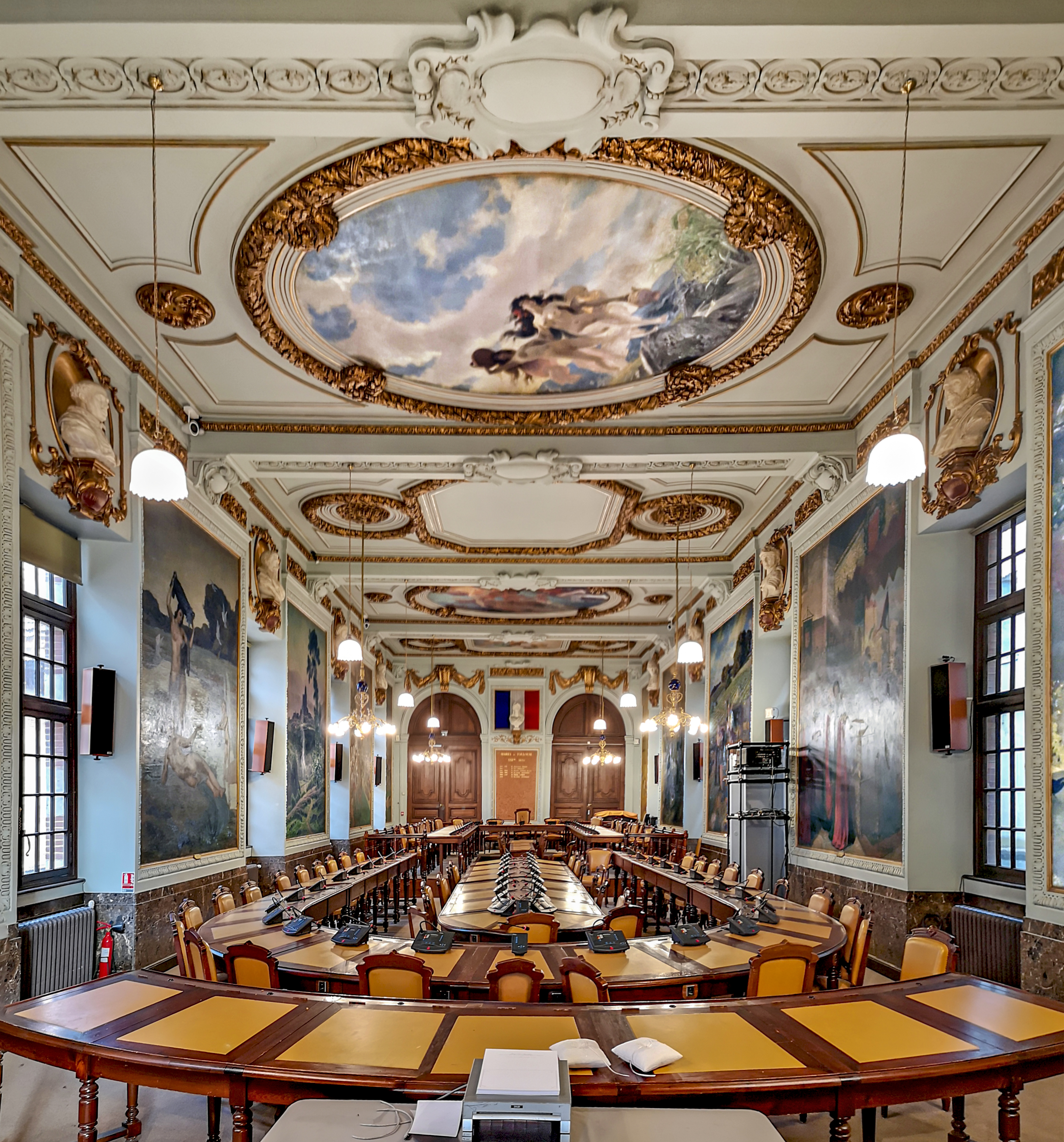
The Municipal Council Room in the present Capitol, dating to the 1750s.

The supervision of the royal intendant reduced the Capitoulate's control over municipal jobs considerably in the 18th century. In 1747, grain riots forced the capitouls to permit royal troops to enter the city freely for the first time. The edicts of 1764 and '65 which implemented the Laverdy Reforms were specially excluded from application in Toulouse through a dispensation secured by the Parliament.

In 1765, King Louis XV fired the then incumbent Capitoul over the trial of Jean Calas, sentenced to death and broken on the wheel - which the King ruled to have been a grave miscarriage of justice.

In the 1770s, a series of anonymous broadsides thoroughly condemned the conduct of the Capitoulate and was successful in securing an arrêt from the royal council in June 1778. The reform consisted of four parts:

- The capitouls were no longer to represent separate districts of the city;
- A Consistory Chief (chef de consistoire) was created, to be appointed by the king and charged with oversight of the capitouls;
- The capitouls were to be specifically proportioned among the town's classes, with two nobles, two former capitouls, and four townsmen; and
- The overlapping councils of the municipal government were recast.

== See also ==
- Handwritten Annals of the City of Toulouse
- Capitole de Toulouse
- History of Toulouse
- French communes
- eschevin, consul, and jurat
- List of the mayors of Toulouse
- seneschal and bailiff
