= Parlement of Toulouse =

Regional appellate court in Kingdom of France

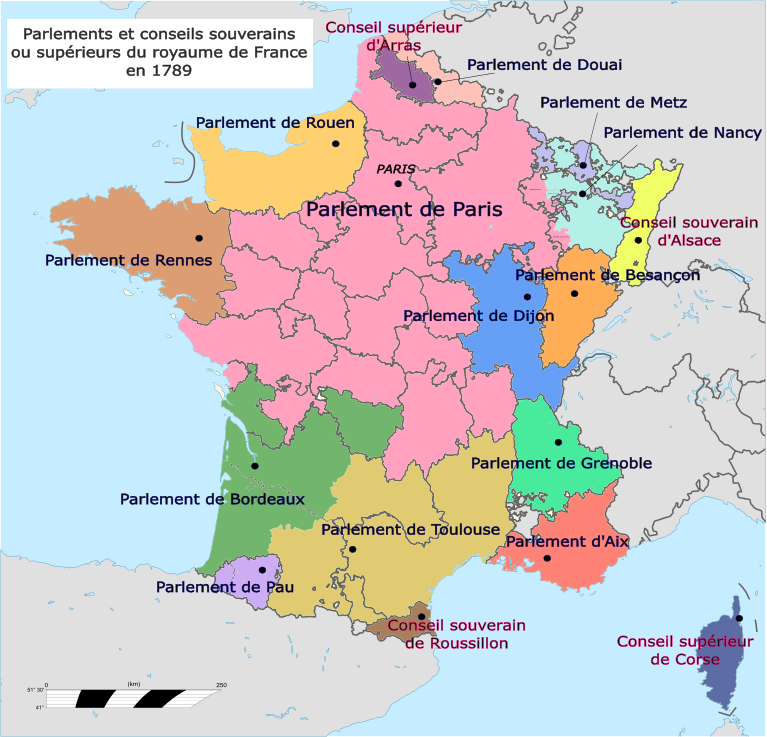
Territories assigned to the Parlements and Sovereign Councils of the Kingdom of France in 1789

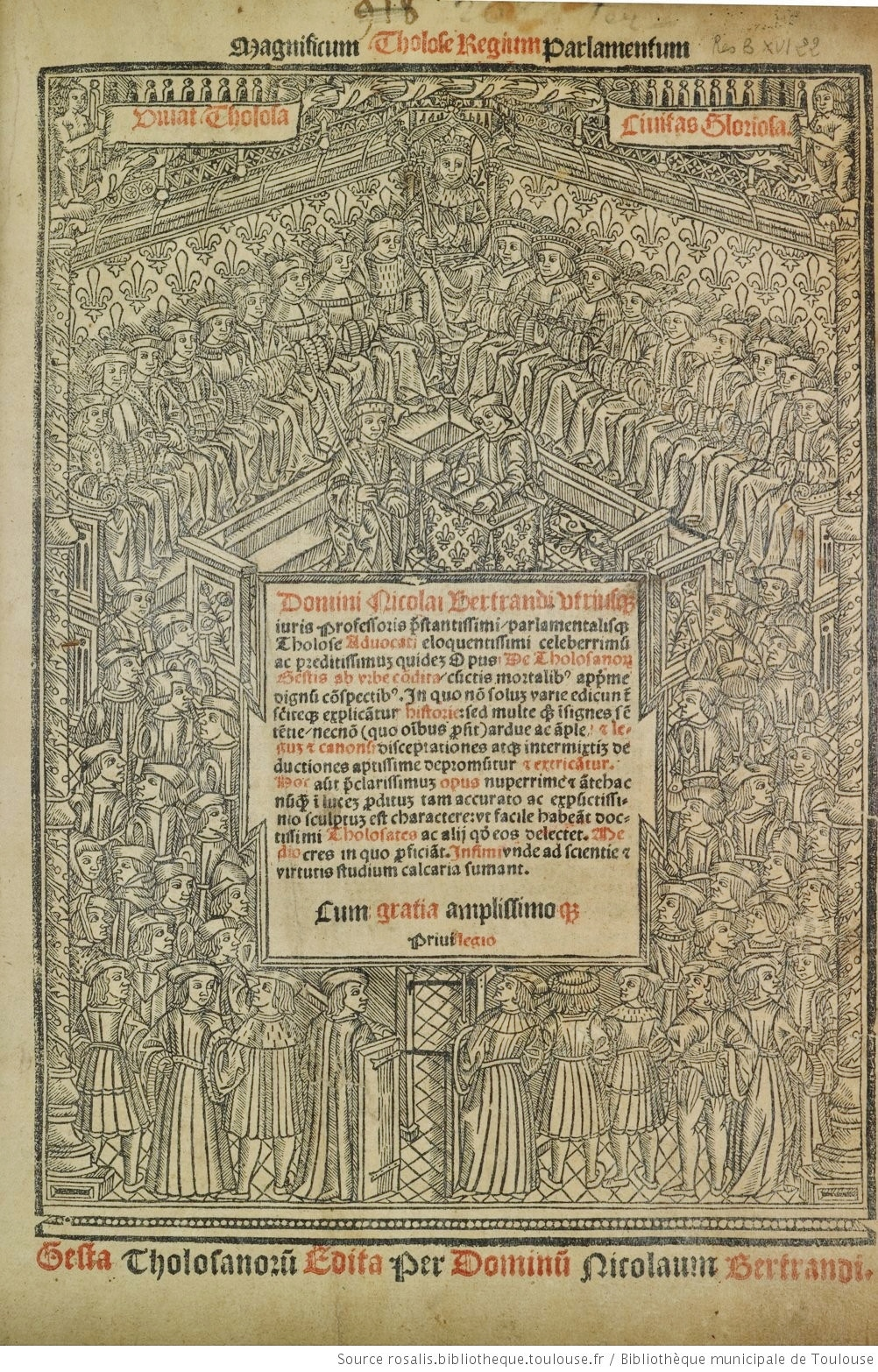
Engraving of a session of the Parlement of Toulouse (1515).

The Parlement of Toulouse (French: Parlement de Toulouse) was one of the parlements of the Kingdom of France, established in the city of Toulouse and responsible for a territory roughly similar to the modern administrative region of Occitania. It was modelled on the Parlement of Paris. It was first created in 1420, but definitely established by edicts in 1437 and 1443 by Charles VII as an appellate court of justice on civil, criminal and ecclesiastic affairs for the Languedoc region, including Quercy, the County of Foix and Armagnac. It was the first provincial parlement, intended to administer the Occitan-speaking south of France, and it gained in prestige both by its distance from Paris and from the differences between southern France's legal system (based on Roman law) and northern France's.

After the Parlement of Paris, the Parlement of Toulouse had the largest jurisdiction in France. Its purview extended from the Rhône to the Atlantic Ocean and from the Pyrénées to the Massif Central, but the creation of the Parlement of Bordeaux in 1462 removed from its jurisdiction Guyenne, Gascony, Landes, Agenais, Béarn and Périgord.

On 4 June 1444, the new parlement of Toulouse moved into a chamber of Toulouse's château narbonnais; its official opening occurred on 11 November of that year.

The Parlement was charged with operating Toulouse's inquisition, burning at least eighteen Protestants alive in the mid-16th century. It was a center of Catholic resistance to the Reformation in the run-up to the 1562 Toulouse Riots and, following its victory on that occasion, completely dominated the town's capitouls.

In 1590, during the French Wars of Religion, Henry IV created the rival Parlement of Carcassonne, attended by parlementarians faithful to the king.

The most famous trials of the Parlement of Toulouse include the case of Martin Guerre and the Calas affair.

With the French Revolution, the Parlement of Toulouse, as too the municipal Capitouls of Toulouse, was suppressed. In June 1794, all the members of the Parlement were executed, following a decision of the Revolutionary Tribunal.

== See also ==
- Capitouls and Capitole de Toulouse
- 1562 Riots of Toulouse
- Gaspard de Fieubet
