= Treatise on Tolerance =

Book by Voltaire

Treatise on Tolerance is a book written by Voltaire, following the trial of Jean Calas (1698-1762), a French Protestant merchant accused of murdering his son Marc-Antoine to prevent his supposed conversion to the Catholic Church. Calas was executed in Toulouse on March 10, 1762, after being tortured; he never confessed to the crime that completely lacked evidence. Calas was executed largely in response to the reaction of an angry mob and the zealousness of some local magistrates. Struck with the extreme injustice of the case, Voltaire undertook a private and public campaign to exonerate Jean Calas. In doing so, he put Catholic prejudice and fanaticism on display. In 1765, after Louis XV fired the chief magistrate and the case was retried by another court, Calas was posthumously exonerated and his family paid 36 thousand francs.

== Arguments ==
"There are about forty million inhabitants in Europe who are not members of the Church of Rome; should we say to every one of them, 'Sir, since you are infallibly damned, I shall neither eat, converse, nor have any connections with you?'"

"O different worshipers of a peaceful God! If you have a cruel heart, if, while you adore He whose whole law consists of these few words, 'Love God and your neighbor'..."

"I see all the dead of past ages and of our own appearing in His presence. Are you very sure that our Creator and Father will say to the wise and virtuous Confucius, to the legislator Solon, to Pythagoras, Zaleucus, Socrates, Plato, the divine Antonins, the good Trajan, to Titus, the delights of mankind, to Epictetus, and to many others, models of men: 'Go, monsters, go and suffer torments that are infinite in intensity and duration. Let your punishment be eternal as I am. But you, my beloved ones, Jean Châtel, Ravaillac, Damiens, Cartouche, etc. who have died according to the prescribed rules, sit forever at my right hand and share my empire and my felicity.' You draw back with horror at these words; and after they have escaped me, I have nothing more to say to you."

== Publication and reception ==
Voltaire finished the work by January 2, 1763, and it was printed by the Cramer brothers in Geneva in April 1763. After copies had been distributed to selected recipients, including Madame de Pompadour, ministers of the French privy council, Frederick the Great, and some German princes, it began to be distributed in October 1763 and was quickly banned. However, the book still made its way to the public, becoming extremely popular in Paris and throughout Europe.

In January 2015, after the Charlie Hebdo shooting, it was reported that Treatise on Tolerance had become a bestseller in France more than 250 years after its first publication.
