= Château Narbonnais =

Medieval castle in Toulouse, Occitania, France

Coordinates: 43.594°N 1.445°E

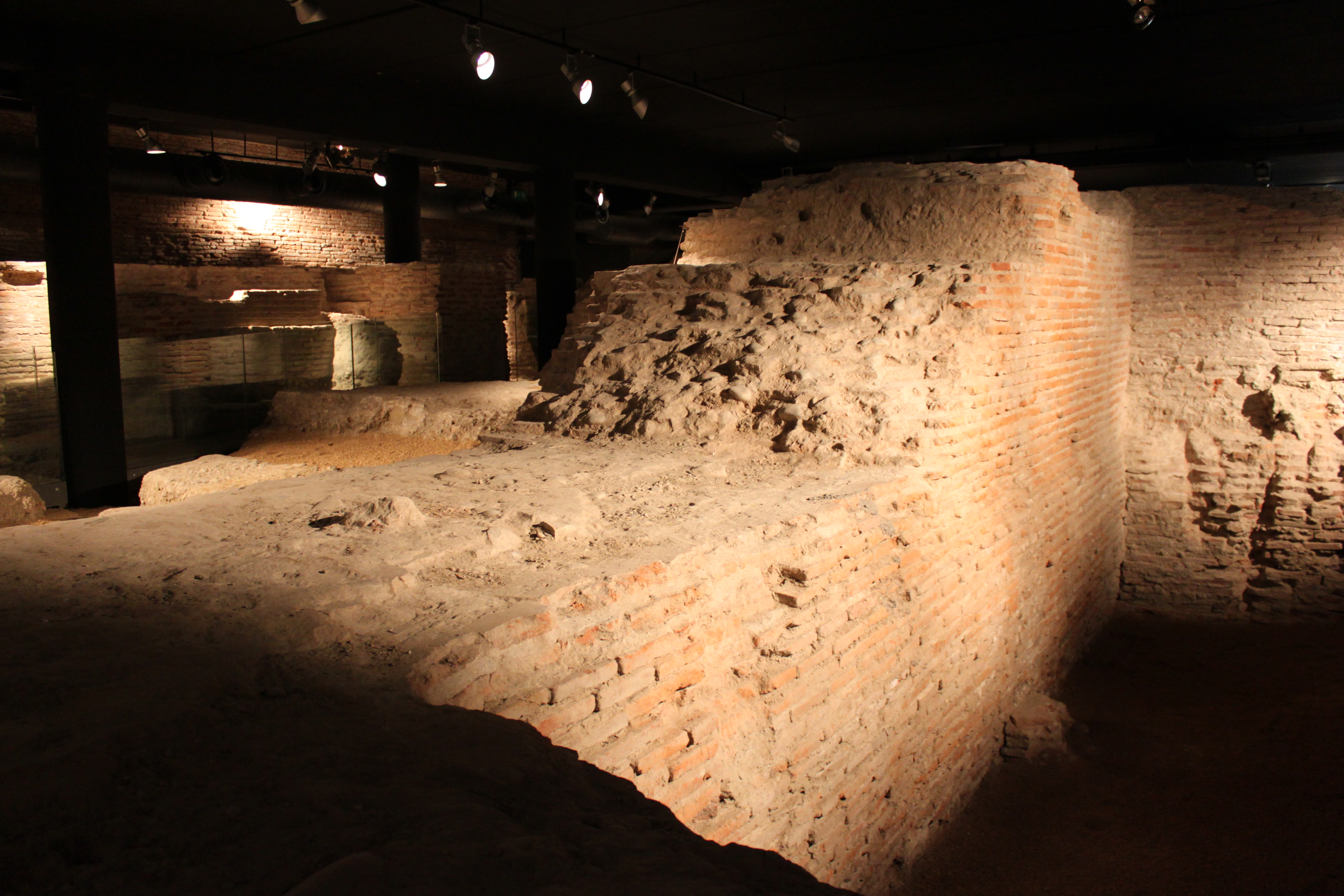
Remains of the Château Narbonnais under the Toulouse courthouse

The Château Narbonnais was a castle of the Counts of Toulouse on the west side of the city Toulouse. The castle featured prominently in the Cathar wars.

== History ==
In May 1215, the City of Toulouse surrendered to Simon de Montfort. In September or October 1216, a popular uprising in the city against the occupying forces forced Simon to leave. On 12 September 1217 Raymond VI of Toulouse re-entered the city, trapping Simon de Montfort's wife's family in the Château.

From 13 September 1217 to 22 July 1218, Simon de Montfort besieged the castle again, and on 25 June 1218, he was hit on the head by a stone from a trebuchet, and died.

The castle was dismantled in 1549.

== Description ==
The castle was dismantled, but depiction of it remains on the Municipal Seal of Toulouse which shows a crenellated castle with three towers
