= Jean Calas =

18th-century French Protestant who was wrongfully tortured and executed

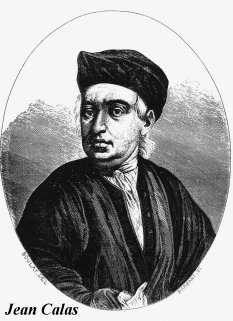
Jean Calas (1698–1762)

Jean Calas (1698 – 10 March 1762) was a merchant living in Toulouse, Languedoc, France, who was tried, judicially tortured, and executed for the murder of his son, despite his protestations of innocence. Calas was a Protestant in an officially Catholic society. Doubts about his guilt were raised by opponents of the Catholic Church and he was exonerated in 1764. In France, he became a symbolic victim of religious intolerance, along with François-Jean de la Barre and Pierre-Paul Sirven.

== Life ==
=== Background ===
Calas, along with his wife, was a Protestant. France was then a Catholic country; Catholicism was the state religion, with no legal right for individuals to practice different faiths. While the harsh oppression of Protestantism initiated by King Louis XIV had largely receded, Protestants were, at best, tolerated. Louis, one of Calas's sons, converted to Catholicism in 1756.

=== Death of Marc-Antoine Calas ===
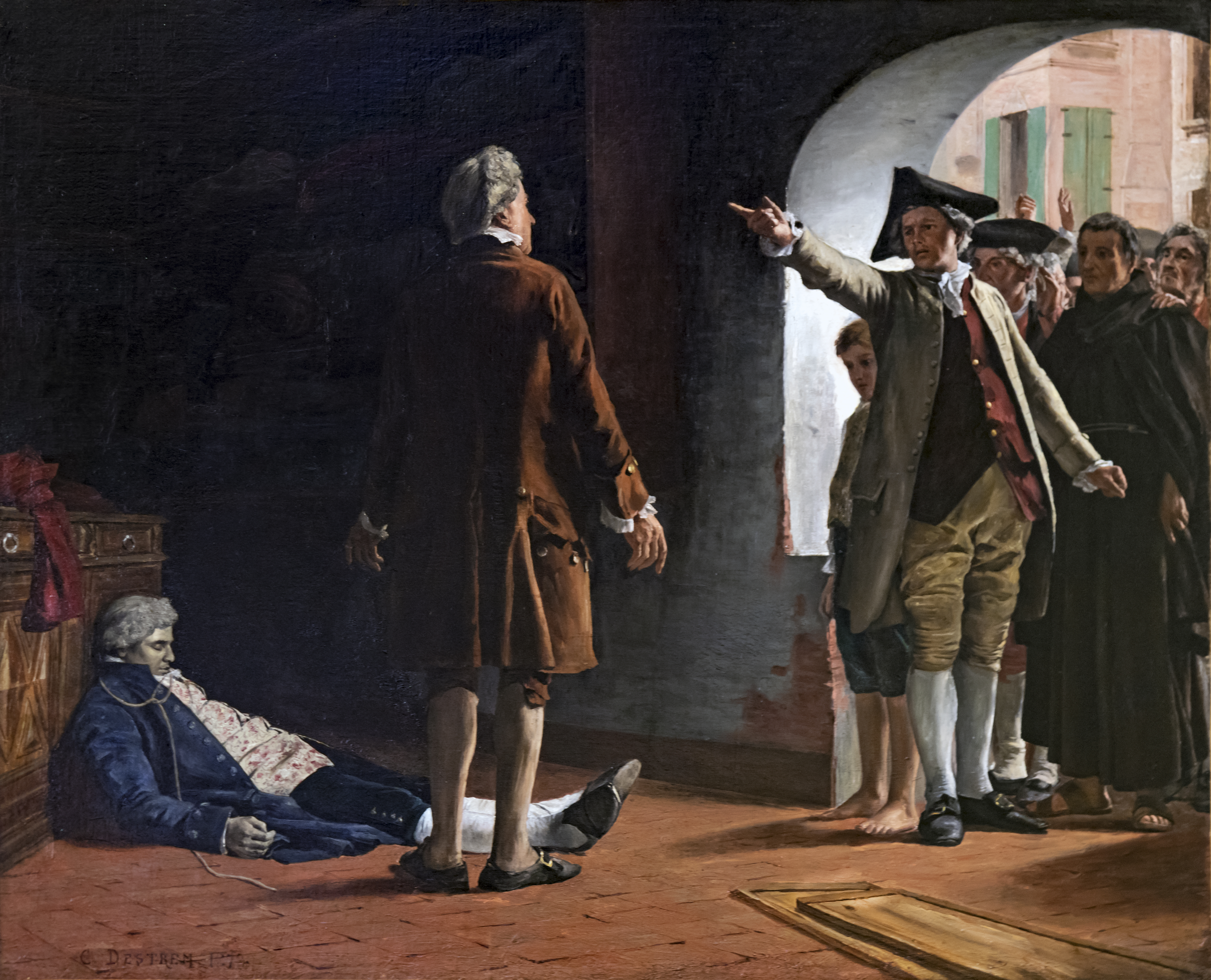
The arrest of Calas.

On 13–14 October 1761, another of the Calas sons, Marc-Antoine, was found dead on the ground floor of the family's home. Rumors had it that Jean Calas had killed his son because he intended to convert to Catholicism. When interrogated, the family initially claimed that Marc-Antoine had been killed by a murderer. Then they declared that they had found Marc-Antoine dead, hanged; because suicide was considered a heinous crime against God, and since the dead bodies of suicides were defiled, they had arranged for their son's suicide to look like a murder.

=== Trial and execution ===
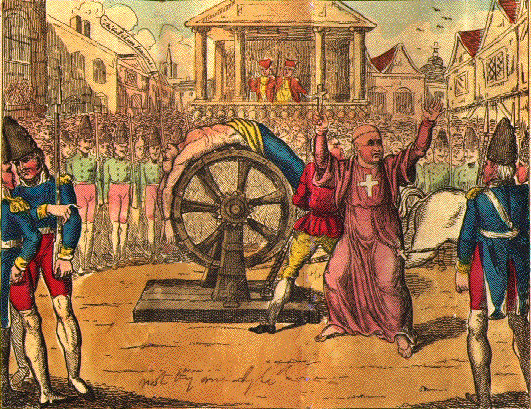
"The cruel death of Calas, who was broken on the wheel at Toulouse, 10 March 1762."

Despite Jean Calas's claiming that his son died by suicide, and the testimony of Jeanne Viguière, Calas's Catholic governess, the parlement (regional court) of Toulouse held that Jean Calas had murdered his son. And on 9 March 1762, the court sentenced him to be broken on the wheel - judicially executed.

The same sentence subjected Calas to death by torture. The government stretched his arms and legs until they were pulled out of their sockets. Seventeen litres (36 US pints) of water was poured down his throat. He was tied to a cross in the cathedral square, on which each of his limbs was broken twice by an iron bar. Yet even under this torture, Calas continued to declare his innocence. On 10 March, at the age of 64, Jean Calas died on the wheel, while still firmly declaring his innocence.

=== Posthumous exoneration ===
French philosopher Voltaire was contacted about the case, and after initial suspicions that Calas was guilty of anti-Catholic fanaticism were dispelled by his investigations, he began a campaign to get Calas's sentence overturned, claiming that Marc-Antoine had committed suicide because of gambling debts and not being able to finish his university studies due to his denomination.

Voltaire's efforts were successful, and King Louis XV received the family and had the sentence annulled in 1764. The king fired the chief magistrate of Toulouse, the Capitoul, the trial was done over, and in 1765 Jean Calas posthumously was exonerated on a "vice de procédure", not on the original charges, with the family paid 36,000 livres by the king in compensation. Voltaire, an outspoken critic of the Catholic church, cited the instance as an example of the church's severity in his 1763 work Treatise on Tolerance.
