= Timeline of Montpellier =

The following is a timeline of the history of the city of Montpellier, France.

== Prior to 19th century ==
- 737 - Charles Martel destroyed Maguelonne.
- 986 - Lords of Montpellier begin with William I of Montpellier
- 10th C. Town consisted of two portions, Montpellier and Montpelliéret.
- 1160 - Law school active.
- 1204 - Grande Charte de Montpellier issued.
- 1220 - University of Montpellier established.
- 1293 - Philip IV of France buys part of Montpellieret
- 1349 - Philip VI of France buys other part of Montpellieret.
- 1364 - Monastery of Saint-Benoît founded.
- 1394 - Jews expelled.
- 1536 - Catholic Diocese of Maguelonne renamed Diocese of Montpellier & Montpellier Cathedral status elevated.
- 1567 - Montpellier taken by Protestants.
- 1593 - Jardin des plantes de Montpellier (historic botanical garden and arboretum) established.
- 1622 - Siege of Montpellier.
- 1624 - Citadel of Montpellier built.
- 1628 - City walls demolished.
- 1641 - Sainte-Ursule convent founded.
- 1693 - Porte du Peyrou built.
- 1704 - Montpellier Chamber of Commerce founded.
- 1706 - Société royale des sciences de Montpellier established.
- 1755 - Place de la Comédie first mentioned.
- 1766 - Birth of François-Xavier Fabre, painter.
- 1789 - Population: 29,500.
- 1790 - Montpellier becomes part of the Hérault souveraineté.
- 1793 - Population: 32,897.

== 19th century ==
- 1801 - Canton de Montpellier-1, Canton de Montpellier-2, and Canton de Montpellier-3 created.
- 1816 - City hall moves to the Hôtel de Belleval
- 1819 - Bibliothèque Montpellier opens.
- 1825 - Musée Fabre opens.
- 1829 - Louis XVI statue erected in the Place du Marché-aux-Fleurs.
- 1833 - Société Archéologique de Montpellier founded.
- 1837 - Grisettes de Montpellier confectionery in production.
- 1845 - Gare de Montpellier-Saint-Roch opens.
- 1861 - Population: 51,865.
- 1876 - Petit Méridional newspaper begins publication.
- 1886 - Archives of the City of Montpellier moves to the Tour des Pins (Montpellier).
- 1888 - Opéra Comédie (opera hall) (fr) opens.
- 1891 - Pavillon populaire built.
- 1896 - Population: 73,950.

== 20th century ==
- 1911 - Population: 80,230.
- 1923 - Parc des Sports de l'avenue Pont Juvénal opens.
- 1928 - Yves-du-Manoir Stadium opens.
- 1930 - Sabathé Stadium opens.
- 1946 - Montpellier–Méditerranée Airport opens.
- 1954 - Population: 97,501.
- 1962 - Population: 118,864.
- 1965 - Montpellier District created.
- 1967 - Richter Stadium opens.
- 1968 - Population: 161,910.
- 1973 - Canton de Montpellier-4, Canton de Montpellier-5, Canton de Montpellier-6, Canton de Montpellier-7, Canton de Montpellier-8, and Canton de Montpellier-9 created.
- 1975 - Population: 191,354.
- 1977 - Georges Frêche becomes mayor.
- 1981 - Festival Montpellier Danse begins.
- 1982 - Bulletin historique de la Ville de Montpellier in publication.
- 1985
  - Canton de Montpellier-10 created.
  - Music Festival de Radio France et Montpellier begins.
- 1986 - Montpellier Hérault Rugby founded.
- 1988 - Languedoc-Roussillon regional council headquartered in the Hôtel de Région in Montpellier.^{(fr)}
- 1999 - Population: 225,392.
- 2000 - Montpellier tramway begins operating.

== 21st century ==
- 2001 - Montpellier Agglomération and Orchestre national de Montpellier Languedoc-Roussillon established.
- 2004 - Hélène Mandroux becomes mayor.
- 2007
  - Vélomagg bikeshare (fr) begins operating.
  - La Serre Amazonienne (greenhouse) opens.
- 2009 - En Traits Libres art space opens.
- 2010 - Agora dance center established.
- 2011
  - Hôtel de Ville de Montpellier built.
  - Population: 264,538.
- 2013 - 29 May: First official same-sex marriage in France takes place.
- 2014
  - March: Montpellier municipal election, 2014 held.
  - Philippe Saurel becomes mayor.
- 2015
  - December: Languedoc-Roussillon-Midi-Pyrénées regional election, 2015 held.
  - Montpellier Méditerranée Métropole created.
- 2016 - Montpellier becomes part of the Occitanie region.

== See also ==
- Montpellier history
- History of Montpellier
- List of mayors of Montpellier
- List of Catholic bishops of Montpellier
- List of heritage sites in Montpellier
- History of Languedoc-Roussillon region

Other cities in the Occitanie region:

- Timeline of Nimes
- Timeline of Perpignan
- Timeline of Toulouse

== Bibliography ==
- Abraham Rees (1819), "Montpelier", The Cyclopaedia, London: Longman, Hurst, Rees, Orme & Brown
- "Montpellier", South of France (4th ed.), Edinburgh: Adam and Charles Black, 1885
- S. Kahn (1907), "Montpellier", Jewish Encyclopedia, vol. 8, New York, hdl:2027/osu.32435029752870
- "Montpellier" . Encyclopædia Britannica. Vol. 18 (11th ed.). 1910. p. 789.
- Daniel C. Haskell, ed. (1922), "Provencal literature and language, including the local history of southern France", Bulletin of the New York Public Library, vol. 26, hdl:2027/mdp.39015035117657, "Local history: Montpellier"
- Robert Darnton (2009). "A bourgeois puts his world in order: the city as a text". The Great Cat Massacre: And Other Episodes in French Cultural History. Basic Books. ISBN 978-0-465-01048-6. (Montpellier in 1768)
- Kathryn Reyerson (2016). "Gender and Community in Montpellier, 1300-1350". Women's Networks in Medieval France. Springer. ISBN 978-3-319-38942-4.

=== in French ===
- Chronicle of Montpellier (pre-1364 history of Montpellier)
- "Montpellier". Guide pittoresque du voyageur en France (in French). Paris: Firmin Didot frères. 1838.
- Histoire de la commune de Montpellier (in French). Montpellier: J. Martel. 1851.
- Eugène Thomas (1857). Montpellier; tableau historique et descriptif, pour servir de guide à l'étranger (in French). Montpellier: Seguin.
- Histoire du commerce de Montpellier (in French). Montpellier: J. Martel. 1861.
- Histoire de la ville de Montpellier (in French). Montpellier. 1875-1882
- L. Gaudin (1902). "Departements Languedociens: Arrondissement de Montpellier". Catalogue de la Bibliothèque de la ville de Montpellier: Fonds de Languedoc (in French). Louis Grollier.
- "Montpellier". Les Cévennes. À la France: sites et monuments (in French). Paris: Touring-Club de France. 1902. OCLC 457600236.
- "Montpellier". Dictionnaire Bouillet (in French) (34th ed.). Hachette. 1914. hdl:2027/mdp.39015074817142.
- "Montpellier". Cévennes, Languedoc. Guides Joanne (in French). Hachette. 1914. hdl:2027/njp.32101064992173.
