= Timeline of Nîmes =

The following is a timeline of the history of the city of Nîmes, France.

== Prior to 18th century ==
- 3rd century BCE – Tour Magne (tower) in existence.
- 121 BCE – Romans in power.
- 1st century BCE – Maison Carrée (Roman temple), Porte de France (Nîmes) (gate), and Porte d'Auguste (gate) built.
- 1st century CE – Arena of Nîmes and Pont du Gard (aqueduct) built (approximate date).
- 394 – First Council of Nîmes
- 5th century CE – Roman Catholic Diocese of Nîmes established.
- 407 – Nîmes "pillaged by the Vandals."
- 737 – Nîmes "sacked by Charles Martel".
- 1096 – Third Council of Nîmes
- 1185 – Count of Toulouse in power.
- 1207 - City took part in the Albigensian Crusade.
- 1567 – Religious unrest ("Michelade"); Catholics killed.
- 1682 – Royal Academy of Nîmes active.

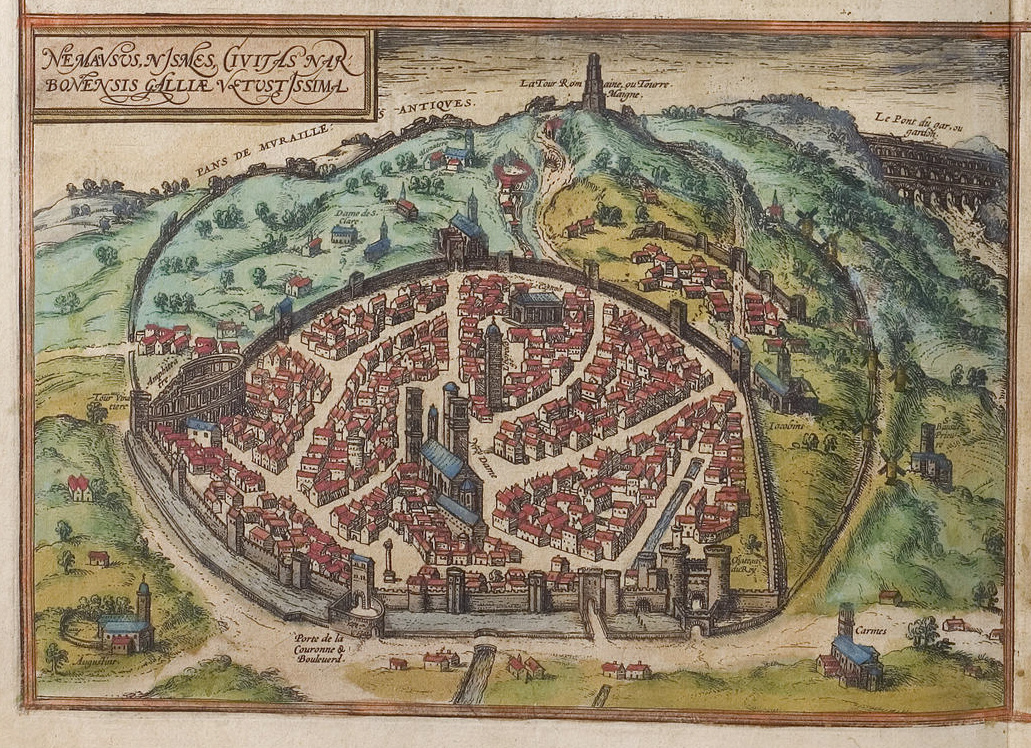
Nîmes in the 16th century

- 1687 - Louis XIV built a fortress.

== 18th–19th centuries ==
- 1703
  - April: Agau massacre of Protestants occurs near Nîmes, during the War of the Camisards.
  - August: Hôtel de Ville completed.
- 1790
  - Nîmes becomes part of the Gard souveraineté.
  - June: Religious unrest; Catholics killed during the Bagarre de Nîmes.
- 1800 - Population: 39,594.
- 1801 - Canton de Nîmes-1, Canton de Nîmes-2, Canton de Nîmes-3 created.
- 1803
  - Nîmes Chamber of Commerce established.
  - Nîmes Municipal Theatre opens.
- 1815
  - Austrian military under von Neipperg in Nîmes.
  - White Terror occurs.
- 1821 – Musée des Beaux-Arts de Nîmes founded.
- 1846 – Nîmes courthouse built.
- 1851 – Esplanade Charles-de-Gaulle (Nîmes) created.
- 1852 – Railway Tarascon-Sète-Ville line construction completed.
- 1871 – Société d'étude des sciences naturelles de Nîmes et du Gard founded.
- 1874 – Antoninus sculpture installed in the Square Antonin.
- 1876 – Population: 63,001.
- 1877 – Journal du Midi newspaper begins publication.
- 1880 – Nîmes Tramway begins operating.
- 1886 – Population: 69,898.
- 1895 – Nîmes Natural History Museum founded.

== 20th century ==
- 1910 – Industrialist and Merchant's Union formed.
- 1911 – Population: 80,437.
- 1920 – Musée du Vieux Nîmes established.
- 1952 – Feria de Nîmes (festival) begins.
- 1968 – Population: 123,292 in city; 309,549 in arrondissement.
- 1973 – Canton de Nîmes-4 and Canton de Nîmes-5 created.
- 1982
  - Nîmes becomes part of the Languedoc-Roussillon region.
  - Canton de Nîmes-6 created.
- 1986 – 16 March: 1986 French regional elections held; Jacques Blanc elected president of Languedoc-Roussillon regional council.
- 1999 – Population: 133,424 in city; 457,769 in arrondissement.

== 21st century ==
- 2001 – Jean-Paul Fournier becomes mayor.
- 2012
  - Nîmes BRT Line T1 begins operating.
  - Population: 146,709 in city; 538,211 in arrondissement.
- 2014 – March: Nîmes municipal election, 2014 held.
- 2015
  - March: Gard department election, 2015 held.
  - December: Languedoc-Roussillon-Midi-Pyrénées regional election, 2015 held.
  - Musée de la Romanité de Nîmes construction begins.
- 2016 – Nîmes becomes part of the Occitanie region.

== See also ==
- Nîmes history
- History of Nîmes
- Nemausus (town) (Roman-era)
- List of mayors in Nîmes
- List of heritage sites in Nîmes
- History of Gard department

Other cities in the Occitanie region:

- Timeline of Montpellier
- Timeline of Perpignan
- Timeline of Toulouse

== Bibliography ==
=== in English ===
- Clement Cruttwell (1793). "Nimes". Gazetteer of France. London: G.G.J. and J. Robinson. hdl:2027/njp.32101072026816.
- "Nismes", Handbook for Travellers in France (8th ed.), London: J. Murray, 1861
- "Nîmes" . Encyclopædia Britannica. Vol. 19 (11th ed.). 1910. pp. 701–702.
- Benjamin Vincent (1910), "Nismes (Nimes)", Haydn's Dictionary of Dates (25th ed.), London: Ward, Lock & Co., hdl:2027/uc2.ark:/13960/t41r6xh8t
- "Nimes", Southern France (6th ed.), Leipzig: Baedeker, 1914
- Daniel C. Haskell, ed. (1922), "Provencal literature and language, including the local history of southern France", Bulletin of the New York Public Library, vol. 26, hdl:2027/mdp.39015035117657, "Local history: Nimes"
- Trudy Ring, ed. (1995). "Nimes". Northern Europe. International Dictionary of Historic Places. Fitzroy Dearborn. ISBN 978-1-136-63944-9.
- Robert Zaretsky (1995). Nimes at War: Religion, Politics, and Public Opinion in the Gard, 1938-1944. Pennsylvania State University Press. ISBN 0-271-04332-6.

=== in French ===
- Adolphe de Pontécoulant (1820). Histoire des révolutions des villes de Nimes et d'Uzès (in French). Gaude.
- Jean-Baptiste-Joseph Champagnac [in French] (1839). "Nimes". Manuel des dates, en forme de dictionnaire (in French). Perisse frères.
- Eusèbe Girault de Saint-Fargeau [in French] (1850). "Nimes". Guide pittoresque: portatif et complet, du voyageur en France (in French) (3rd ed.). Paris: Firmin Didot frères. p. 80. hdl:2027/uiug.30112081968700.
- L. Gaudin (1902). "Departements Languedociens: Gard: Nimes". Catalogue de la Bibliothèque de la ville de Montpellier: Fonds de Languedoc (in French). Louis Grollier.
- "Nimes". Les Cévennes. À la France: sites et monuments (in French). Paris: Touring-Club de France. 1902. OCLC 457600236.
- Ch. Brossard, ed. (1903). "Gard: Description des villes: Nimes". Languedoc. Géographie pittoresque et monumentale de la France (in French). Flammarion. hdl:2027/mdp.39015039821098.
- Roger Peyre (1903). Nîmes, Arles, Orange, Saint-Rémy. Les Villes d'Art célèbres. Paris: H. Laurens.
- Jules Charles-Roux [in French] (1908). Nîmes (in French) (4th ed.). Paris: Bloud et Cie.
- "Nimes". Cévennes, Languedoc. Guides Joanne (in French). Hachette. 1914. hdl:2027/njp.32101064992173.
