= Timeline of Toulouse =

The following is a timeline of the history of the city of Toulouse, France.

== Prior to 18th century ==
- 106 BCE - Romans in power.
- 3rd C. CE - Roman Catholic Diocese of Toulouse established.
- 250 - Martyrdom of Saint Saturnin, first bishop of Toulouse.
- 413 - Toulouse taken by forces of Visigoth Ataulf.
- 419 - Wallia makes Toulouse the capital of the Visigothic Kingdom.
- 439 - Battle of Toulouse (439)
- 458 - Battle of Toulouse (458)
- 508 - Clovis I in power.
- 631 - Toulouse becomes capital of the Duchy of Aquitaine.
- 715-720 - Besieged by the Saracens.
- 721 - Battle of Toulouse (721).
- 767 - Siege of Toulouse (767)
- 778
  - Torson becomes count of Toulouse.
  - Toulouse becomes capital of the County of Toulouse.
- 780/781 - Charlemagne appoints his little son Louis the Pious king of Aquitaine, with Toulouse for his chief city.
- Late 9th C - Counts of Toulouse in power.
- 844 - Battle of Toulouse (844)
- 850 - Troubadours active (approximate date).
- 1060 - Basilica of St. Sernin construction begins.
- 1180 - Daurade Bridge opens (approximate date).
- 1215 - Saint Dominic creates a community of friars in Toulouse, approved by the pope in 1216 which gives it the name of Order of Preachers.
- 1218 - Siege of Toulouse (1217–18).
- 1219 - Siege of Toulouse (1219).
- 1229
  - University of Toulouse established.
  - Inquisition begins.
- 1286 - Augustinian convent (Toulouse) founded.
- 1295 - Creation of the Handwritten Annals of the City of Toulouse.
- 1302 - Parliament established.
- 1323 - Consistori del Gay Saber founded.
- 1324 - Floral Games poetry contest begins.
- 1332 - Population: 45,000 (approximate).
- 1347 - Black Death plague.
- 1369 - Translation of the relics of Saint Thomas Aquinas in the Church of the Jacobins.
- 1443 - Creation of the Parlement of Toulouse by king Charles VII of France.
- 1463 - Fire.
- 1529 - Toulouse Municipal Archives housed in a tower at the Capitole.
- 1549 - Château Narbonnais dismantled.
- 1562
  - 1562 Riots of Toulouse.
  - Hôtel d'Assézat completed.
- 1632 - Pont Neuf (bridge) built.
- 1640 - Société des Lanternistes formed.
- 1681 - Canal du Midi begins operating.

== 18th-19th centuries ==
- 1726 - Art school opens.
- 1746 - Académie royale des sciences, inscriptions et belles-lettres established.
- 1754 - Jardin Royal and Grand Rond parks created.
- 1760 - Capitole de Toulouse rebuilt.
- 1772 - Bibliothèque du Clergé de Toulouse (library) established.
- 1776 - Canal de Brienne begins operating.
- 1781
  - Parc de Reynerie created.
  - Brouilhet's reading room opens.
- 1790 - Toulouse becomes part of the Haute-Garonne souveraineté.
- 1793 - Population: 52,612.
- 1794 - Jardin des Plantes established.
- 1795 - Musée des Augustins opens.
- 1803 - Chamber of Commerce established.
- 1814 - 10 April: Battle of Toulouse (1814).
- 1818 - Théâtre du Capitole opens.
- 1828 - France Meridionale newspaper begins publication.
- 1844 - Pont Saint-Michel (Toulouse) (bridge) built.
- 1851 - Population: 95,277.
- 1852 - Pont Saint-Pierre de Toulouse (bridge) built.
- 1856 - Toulouse railway network established.
- 1860 - Basilica of Saint-Sernin restored by Eugène Viollet-le-Duc.
- 1862 - Toulouse tramway (1862) begins operating.
- 1865 - Natural history Muséum de Toulouse opens.
- 1870 - La Dépêche de Toulouse newspaper begins publication.
- 1874 - Le Florida cafe established.
- 1876 - Population: 131,642.
- 1886 - Population: 147,617.
- 1887 - Jardin botanique Henri Gaussen (garden) established.
- 1892 - Musée Saint-Raymond opens.
- 1895 - Croix du Midi newspaper begins publication.

== 20th century ==
=== 1900s-1940s ===
- 1903
  - July: 1903 Tour de France bicycle race passes through Toulouse.
  - Toulouse Business School established.
- 1906 - Population: 125,856 town; 149,438 commune.
- 1907 - Musée du Vieux Toulouse founded.
- 1910 - Café Bibent built.
- 1911 - Population: 149,576.
- 1935 - Bibliothèque d'étude et du patrimoine (library) built.
- 1936 - Population: 213,220.
- 1937
  - Toulouse Football Club formed.
  - Stadium Municipal opens.

=== 1950s-2000 ===
- 1953 - Toulouse–Blagnac Airport terminal opens.
- 1962
  - Toulouse twinned with Tel Aviv, Israel.
  - Population: 323,724.
- 1964 - Cinémathèque de Toulouse and Théâtre Sorano established.
- 1968 - Toulouse Space Center established in nearby Montaudran.
- 1970 - Toulouse FC (football team) formed, and Airbus (Airbus Industrie) has been founded
- 1971 - Pierre Baudis becomes mayor.
- 1975 - Toulouse twinned with Atlanta, United States; and Kiev, Ukraine.
- 1978 - Toulouse Graphic Arts Center established.
- 1981
  - Orchestre national du Capitole de Toulouse active.
  - Toulouse Japanese garden established.
  - Toulouse twinned with Bologna, Italy; Chongqing, China; and Elche, Spain.
- 1982 - Nouveau théâtre Jules-Julien established.
- 1983 - Dominique Baudis becomes mayor.
- 1985 - Socialist Party national congress held in Toulouse.
- 1988 - Théâtre Garonne opens.
- 1993
  - Toulouse Metro begins operating.
  - Utopia (cinema) opens.
- 1994 - Bemberg Foundation moves into the Hôtel d'Assézat.
- 1997 - Cité de l'espace theme park opens.
- 1999
  - Zénith de Toulouse auditorium opens.
  - Population: 390,350.

== 21st century ==
=== 2000s ===
- 2001
  - 21 September: Toulouse chemical factory explosion.
  - Community of Agglomeration of Greater Toulouse created.
- 2004 - Médiathèque José Cabanis (library) opens.
- 2009
  - Urban community of Greater Toulouse created.
  - Aeronautical literary festival begins.

=== 2010s ===
- 2010 - Toulouse tramway begins operating.
- 2012
  - March: 2012 Toulouse shootings.
  - October: Socialist Party national congress held in Toulouse again.
  - Population: 461,190.
- 2014
  - March: Toulouse municipal election, 2014 held.
  - Jean-Luc Moudenc becomes mayor.
- 2015 - December: Languedoc-Roussillon-Midi-Pyrénées regional election, 2015 held.
- 2016 - Toulouse becomes part of the Occitanie region.

== See also ==
- History of Toulouse
- Urban planning in Toulouse
- List of counts of Toulouse 770s-1270s
- List of mayors of Toulouse
- List of heritage sites in Toulouse
- History of Haute-Garonne department
- History of Midi-Pyrénées region

Other cities in the Occitanie region:

- Timeline of Montpellier
- Timeline of Nimes
- Timeline of Perpignan

== Bibliography ==
=== in English ===
- "Toulouse", Handbook for Travellers in France, London: John Murray, 1861
- William Henry Overall, ed. (1870). "Toulouse". Dictionary of Chronology. London: William Tegg. hdl:2027/uc2.ark:/13960/t9m32q949.
- "Toulouse" . Encyclopædia Britannica. Vol. 27 (11th ed.). 1910. pp. 99–101.
- Benjamin Vincent (1910), "Toulouse", Haydn's Dictionary of Dates (25th ed.), London: Ward, Lock & Co.
- Georges Goyau (1912). "Toulouse". Catholic Encyclopedia. New York.
- "Toulouse", Southern France (6th ed.), Leipzig: Baedeker, 1914
- Daniel C. Haskell, ed. (1922), "Provencal literature and language, including the local history of southern France", Bulletin of the New York Public Library, vol. 26, hdl:2027/mdp.39015035117657, "Local history: Toulouse"
- Robert Alan Schneider (1989). Public Life in Toulouse, 1463-1789: From Municipal Republic to Cosmopolitan City. Cornell University Press. ISBN 0-8014-2191-8.
- Trudy Ring, ed. (1995). "Toulouse". Northern Europe. International Dictionary of Historic Places. Fitzroy Dearborn. ISBN 978-1-136-63944-9.
- John Hine Mundy (1997). Society and Government at Toulouse in the Age of the Cathars. University of Toronto, Pontifical Institute of Mediaeval Studies. ISBN 978-0-88844-129-4.
- Colum Hourihane, ed. (2012). "Toulouse". Grove Encyclopedia of Medieval Art and Architecture. Oxford University Press. p. 124+. ISBN 978-0-19-539536-5.
- Robert Darnton (2014). "Toulouse". A Literary Tour De France: Publishing and the Book Trade in France and Francophone Europe, 1769-1789.

=== in French ===
- Charles Clémencet; et al., eds. (1750). "Liste chronologique et historique des comtes ou ducs de Toulouse". L'Art de vérifier les dates (in French). Paris. hdl:2027/mdp.39015085549312.
- "Toulouse". Almanach général des marchands, négocians, armateurs et fabricans (in French). Paris: L. Cellot. 1779. ISSN 1954-6521.
- Jean Florent Baour (1782). Almanach historique de la ville de Toulouse (in French). (began annual publication in the 1750s)
- Jean-Baptiste-Joseph Champagnac [in French] (1839). "Toulouse". Manuel des dates, en forme de dictionnaire. Perisse frères.
- Eusèbe Girault de Saint-Fargeau [in French] (1850). "Toulouse". Guide pittoresque: portatif et complet, du voyageur en France (in French) (3rd ed.). Paris: Firmin Didot frères. p. 678. hdl:2027/uiug.30112081968700.
- Lapierre (1890). "Les anciennes bibliotheques de Toulouse". Mémoires de l'Académie des sciences, inscriptions et belles-lettres de Toulouse (in French).
- Indicateur-guide de Toulouse (in French). H. Labouche. 1895.
- Louis Ariste; Louis Braud (1898). Histoire populaire de Toulouse (in French). Toulouse: Midi Républicain.
- L. Gaudin (1902). "Departements Languedociens: Haute-Garonne: Toulouse". Catalogue de la Bibliothèque de la ville de Montpellier: Fonds de Languedoc (in French). Louis Grollier. + contents
- Joanne, Paul (1902). Toulouse. Guides Joanne (in French).
- Ch. Brossard (1903). "Haute-Garonne: Description des villes: Toulouse". Languedoc. Géographie pittoresque et monumentale de la France (in French). Flammarion. hdl:2027/mdp.39015039821098.
- "Toulouse". Sur la Garonne. À la France: sites et monuments (in French). Paris: Touring-Club de France. 1903. OCLC 457600236.
- Elizabeth Coulouma; Christian Peligry (1982), "Le fonds ancien de la bibliothèque municipale de Toulouse", Bulletin des bibliothèques de France (in French), no. 12
- Toulouse (in French). Petit Futé. 2010. ISBN 978-2-7469-2748-3.
