= Timeline of Perpignan =

The following is a timeline of the history of the city of Perpignan, France.

== Before the 17th century ==
- 990s–1110s CE – Seat of Count of Roussillon relocated to Perpignan from Ruscino.
- 1172 – Power passes from Counts of Roussillon to the Crown of Aragon.
- 1276 – Perpignan becomes capital of the Kingdom of Majorca.
- 1309 – Palace of the Kings of Majorca built.
- 1318 – Hôtel de Ville completed.
- 1324 – Cathedral of Saint John the Baptist construction begins.
- 1349 – University of Perpignan established by Kings of Aragon.
- 1360 – Public clock installed (approximate date).
- 1388 - Consulate of the Sea established.
- 1475 - French take power.
- 1500 - Printing press in use.
- 1509 - Perpignan Cathedral completed.
- 1542 - Siege of Perpignan (1542) by forces of Francis I of France.

== 17th–19th centuries ==
- 1601 - Roman Catholic Diocese of Perpignan-Elne established.
- 1642 – Siege of Perpignan (1642); French win.
- 1659 – City becomes part of France per Treaty of the Pyrenees.
- 1790 – Perpignan becomes part of the Pyrénées-Orientales souveraineté.
- 1793
  - 17 July: Battle of Perpignan (1793).
  - Population: 9,134.
- 1804 – Municipal library active.
- 1819 – Journal de Perpignan et des Pyrénées-Orientales newspaper in publication.
- 1833 – Musée de Perpignan (museum) established.
- 1840 – Musée d'Histoire naturelle de Perpignan (museum) established.
- 1846 – L'Indépendant newspaper begins publication.
- 1870 – Le Roussillon newspaper begins publication.
- 1872 – Hôtel Pams (house) built.
- 1900 – Tramway de Perpignan begins operating.

== 20th century ==
- 1911
  - Cinéma Le Castillet opens.
  - Population: 39,510.
- 1921 – Population: 53,742.
- 1923 – Aérodrome de la Llabanère begins operating.
- 1934 – Canet Roussillon FC (football club) formed.
- 1940 – Stade Aimé Giral (stadium) opens.
- 1946 – Roussillon Grand Prix motor race begins.
- 1952 – Trolleybus de Perpignan begins operating.
- 1962 – Stade Gilbert Brutus (stadium) opens.
- 1964 – Perpignan–Rivesaltes Airport terminal rebuilt.
- 1968 – Population: 102,191.
- 1982 – Association archéologique des Pyrénées-Orientales headquartered in Perpignan.^{(fr)}
- 1996 – La Semaine du Roussillon newspaper begins publication.

== 21st century ==
- 2004 – Compagnie de transports Perpignan Méditerranée (transit entity) active.
- 2006 – Population: 114,000.
- 2013 – Perpignan–Barcelona high-speed rail line begins operating.
- 2014 – March: Perpignan municipal election, 2014 held.
- 2020 – June: the first time that the Marine Le Pen's party has won a city of more than 100,000 people. Louis Aliot becomes Mayor.

== See also ==
- Perpignan history (fr)
- History of Pyrénées-Orientales department

Other cities in the Occitanie region:

- Timeline of Montpellier
- Timeline of Nimes
- Timeline of Toulouse

== Bibliography ==
- Abraham Rees (1819), "Perpignan", The Cyclopaedia, London: Longman, Hurst, Rees, Orme & Brown
- Jean-Baptiste-Joseph Champagnac [in French] (1839). "Perpignan". Manuel des dates, en forme de dictionnaire (in French). Perisse frères.
- Bouillet, Marie Nicolas (1842). "Perpignan". Dictionnaire Bouillet (in French).
- Pierre Vidal (1897). Histoire de la ville de Perpignan depuis les origines jusqu'au Traité des Pyrénées (in French). Paris: H. Welter.
- "Perpignan", Jewish Encyclopedia, vol. 9, New York, 1905
- "Perpignan" . Encyclopædia Britannica. Vol. 21 (11th ed.). 1910. pp. 182–183.
- "Perpignan". Pyrénées. Guides Joanne (in French). Paris. 1912. hdl:2027/njp.32101007980228. + 1858 ed.
- "Perpignan", Southern France (6th ed.), Leipzig: Baedeker, 1914, hdl:2027/uc1.31822019077254
- Daniel C. Haskell, ed. (1922), "Provencal literature and language, including the local history of southern France", Bulletin of the New York Public Library, vol. 26, hdl:2027/mdp.39015035117657, "Local history: Perpignan"
