= Parc des Sports =

Parc des Sports may refer to the following:

- Parc des Sports Aguiléra, a multi-purpose stadium in Biarritz, France
- Parc des Sports (Annecy), a multi-use stadium in Annecy, France
- Parc des Sports (Avignon), a multi-purpose stadium in Avignon, France
- Parc des Sports de l'avenue du Pont Juvénal, a multi-use stadium in Montpellier, France
- Parc des Sports et de l'Amitié, a multi-use stadium in Narbonne, France
- Parc des Sports Michel Hidalgo, a multi-use stadium in Sannois, France
- Parc des Sports (Saint-Ouen-l'Aumône), a multi-use stadium in Saint-Ouen-l'Aumône, France
