= History of Toulouse =

The history of Toulouse, in Occitania, southern France, traces back to ancient times. After Roman rule, the city was ruled by the Visigoths and Merovingian and Carolingian Franks. Capital of the County of Toulouse during the Middle Ages, today it is the capital of the Midi-Pyrénées region.

== Before 118 BC: pre-Roman times ==
Archaeological evidence dates human settlement in Toulouse to the 8th century BC. Its location was advantageous; the Garonne River bends westward toward the Atlantic Ocean, and can be crossed easily. People settled on the hills overlooking the river, in the modern locality of Vieille-Toulouse (literally "Old-Toulouse"), 9 kilometres (5.6 mi) south of present downtown Toulouse. Just north of the hills is a large plain suitable for agriculture, and the site was a center for trade between the Pyrenees, the Mediterranean and the Atlantic. The historical name of the city, Tolosa (Τολῶσσα in Greek, and of its inhabitants, the Tolosates, first recorded in the 2nd century BC), researchers agree that it was probably Aquitanian (an ancestor of the Basque language), its meaning is unknown. Toulouse's name has remained almost unchanged through the centuries (rare for a French city), despite Celtic, Roman and Germanic invasions.

The first inhabitants were apparently the Aquitani, of whom little is known. Later came Iberians from the south, who (like the Aquitani) were non-Indo-Europeans. During the third century BC the Volcae Tectosages (a Gallic tribe from Belgium or southern Germany) arrived, the first Indo-Europeans in the region. They settled in Tolosa, intermarrying with the local people, and their Gaulish language became predominant. By 200 BC, Tolosa is attested on coins as the capital of the Volcae Tectosages (which Julius Caesar called Tolosates—singular Tolosas—in his Commentarii de Bello Gallico). According to archaeologists, Tolosa was one of the wealthiest and most important cities in Gaul during the pre-Roman era. Gold and silver mines were nearby, and offerings to its shrines and temples accumulated wealth in the city.

== 118 BC–AD 418: Roman period ==
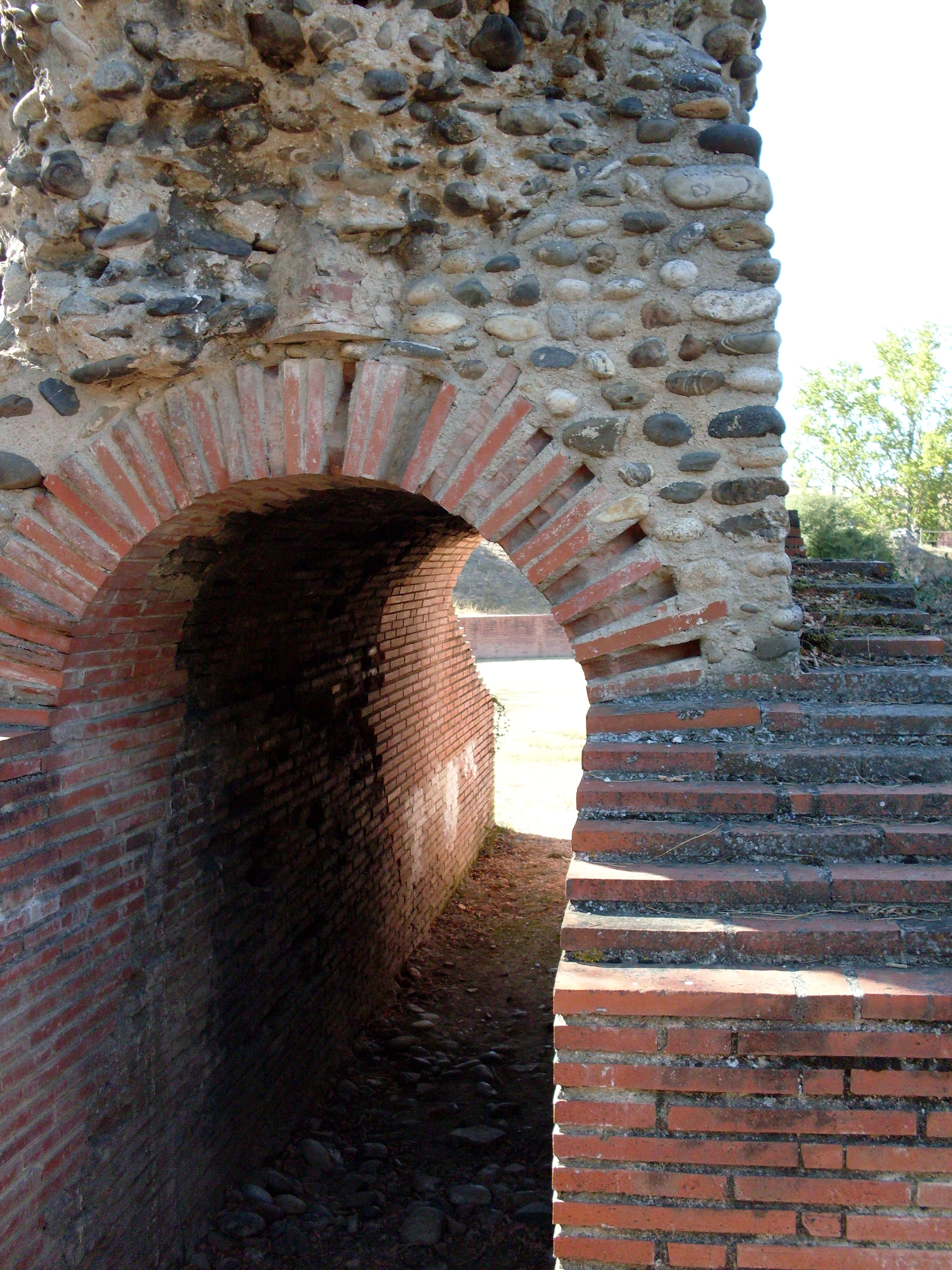
Vomitorium of the Toulouse amphitheatre

The Romans began their conquest of southern Gaul (later known as the Provincia) in 125 BC. In 118 BC they founded the colony of Narbo Martius (Narbonne, the Mediterranean city nearest to inland Toulouse) and made contact with the Tolosates, noted for their wealth and the position of their capital for trade with the Atlantic. Tolosa allied with the Romans, who established a fort on the plain north of the city (a key position near the border of independent Aquitania) but otherwise left Tolosa semi-independent.

In 109 BC the Germanic Cimbri tribe descended the Rhône Valley, invaded the Provincia and defeated the Romans, whose power was shaken along the recently conquered Mediterranean coast. The Tolosates rebelled against Rome, killing the Roman garrison, before Rome recovered and defeated the invaders. In 106 BC, Quintus Servilius Caepio was sent to reconquer and punish Tolosa. With the aid of Tolosates who remained loyal to Rome, he captured the city and the wealth of its temples and shrines.

Tolosa was then incorporated into the Roman Provincia (Provincia Romana, the common name for the province of Transalpine Gaul with its capital at Narbo Martius). Although Tolosa was an important military garrison at the western border of the Roman empire, the city remained a backwater in the Provincia and people still lived in the old Celtic city in the hills. No Roman colony was established, and few soldiers settled in the area.

After the conquest of Gaul by Julius Caesar, Tolosa did not participate in the uprisings against Rome during the Gallic wars and southern France would be the most Romanized part of France after the decline of the Roman Empire. Caesar established his camp on the Tolosa plain in 52 BC, conquering western Aquitania. With the conquest of Aquitania and Gaul, Tolosa was no longer a military outpost. Capitalizing on its position for trade between the Mediterranean and the Atlantic (both now under Roman control), the city grew rapidly.

The most important event in the city's history was the decision to relocate north of the hills. A typical Roman city, with straight streets, was founded on the plain on the beginning bank of the river between the end of Augustus' reign and the beginning of Tiberius' (about 10–30 AD). The population was forced to relocate to the new city (also named Tolosa), and the old settlement was abandoned. Walls were built around the new city, probably at the initiative of Emperor Augustus (who wanted to create a major city at the junction of the newly built Via Aquitania and the Garonne); such walls, unnecessary during the Pax Romana, were built as an imperial favor to indicate a city's status. Until the fall of Rome, the new Tolosa was a civitas of the province of Gallia Narbonensis (with its capital Narbo Martius—Narbonne—the new name of the old provincia).

With imperial favor and thriving trade, Tolosa became a major city in the Roman Empire. During the civil war following Nero's death, Tolosa native M. Antonius Primus led the armies of Vespasian into Italy, entered Rome in 69 AD and established the Flavian dynasty. Emperor Domitian, son of Vespasian and Primus' friend, granted Tolosa the honorific status of Roman colony. Another sign of imperial favor was Domitian's bestowal of the title of Palladia on the city in reference to Pallas Athena, goddess of arts and knowledge.

Palladia Tolosa was a major Roman city, with aqueducts, circus and theaters, thermae, a forum and an extensive sewage system. Protected by its walls and its distance from the Rhine, it escaped unscathed from the third-century invasions. With much of Gaul destroyed, Toulouse was the fourth-largest city in the western half of the Roman Empire after Rome, Treves and Arles. Around that time, Christianity entered the city; the Christian community expanded under Saint Saturnin (locally known as Saint Sernin), the first bishop of Toulouse, who was martyred in Toulouse about 250. In 313 the Edict of Milan established religious freedom in the empire, ending persecution of the Christians, and in 403 the Saint-Sernin basilica opened as a shrine for relics of Saint Saturnin.

On 31 December 406 the Rhine frontier was breached by tribes seeking to escape starvation during a harsh winter. In 407, Toulouse was besieged by the Vandals. Under its bishop, Saint Exuperius, the city resisted; the Vandals lifted the siege, moving into Spain and settling in North Africa. "The provinces of Aquitaine and of the Novempopulana (Gascony), of Lyon and of Narbonne are, with the exception of a few cities, one universal scene of desolation. And those which the sword spares without, famine ravages within. I cannot speak without tears of Toulouse which has been kept from failing hitherto by the merits of its reverend bishop Exuperius", wrote Jerome to a Roman widow in 409 (Letters cxxiii.16). In 413 (three years after they sacked Rome), the Visigoths under King Ataulf captured Toulouse; under pressure from Roman forces, they soon withdrew south of the Pyrenees. After the murder of Ataulf, his successor Wallia resolved to make peace with Rome. In exchange for peace, in 418 Emperor Honorius gave the Visigoths Aquitania and Toulouse (in Gallia Narbonensis, at the border of Aquitania). The Visigoths chose Palladia Tolosa as their capital, ending Roman rule of the city.

== 418–508: Visigothic kingdom of Toulouse ==
Kingdom of the Visigoths by 500

The Visigothic kings of Toulouse, one of the foederati (allies) of the Roman Empire in the West and limited to Aquitania and Toulouse, soon began encroaching on neighboring territories. As Roman allies the Visigoths helped defeat Germanic invaders in Spain (notably the Suebi), taking advantage of their position to expand their territory south of the Pyrenees. They tried to conquer the Mediterranean coast of the province of Gallia Narbonensis, but were opposed by Rome. In 439 the Roman general Litorius defeated the Visigoths at Narbonne, driving them back to Toulouse. Although he besieged the city, he was defeated and taken prisoner. Avitus, the praetorian prefect of Gaul with influence on King Theodoric I of the Visigoths, was then sent to Toulouse and concluded a peace. In 451, threatened by an invasion of the Huns in Gaul, he negotiated a treaty between Rome and the Visigoths and they defeated the Huns. In 455 Avitus, magister militum (senior military officer of the Empire) on a diplomatic mission to King Theodoric II of the Visigoths, was proclaimed the new Roman emperor in Toulouse by his Visigothic friends amid news that the Vandals had sacked Rome and Emperor Petronius Maximus had been murdered. Avitus' reign in Rome was brief, and he was defeated by his enemies in 456. This antagonized the Visigoths, who warred with the new Roman leaders, and a weaker Rome gave way. The Narbonne region was conquered by the Visigoths in 462.

King Euric (466–484), an enemy of Rome, extended the Visigothic territory in Gaul and Spain. In 475 he dissolved the treaty with Rome, proclaiming independence a year before the fall of the Western Roman Empire. Toulouse was now the capital of an expanding Gothic kingdom; by the end of the fifth century, the kingdom of Toulouse extended from the Loire Valley in the north to the Strait of Gibraltar in the south and from the Rhône in the east to the Atlantic Ocean in the west (the largest territory controlled from Toulouse).

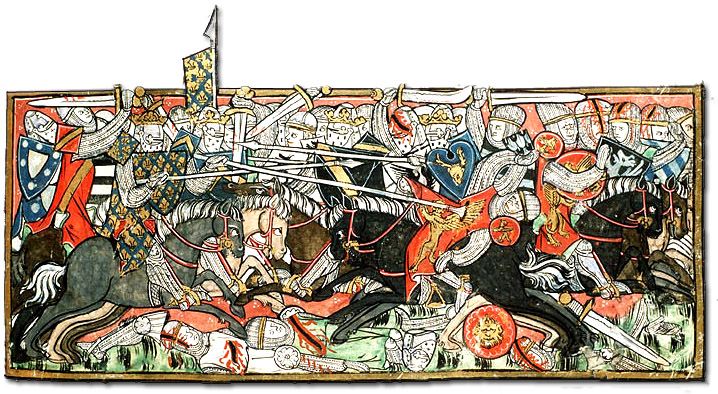
Battle between Clovis and the Visigoths

Unlike most cities in western Europe, Toulouse remained prosperous during the Migration Period. Although the Visigoths professed Arianism (a non-Trinitarian form of Christianity) and lived apart from their Gallo-Roman subjects, they were generally well accepted for bringing protection and prosperity. Behind its first-century walls, the city encompassed the same area; most western European cities were hastily enclosing small portions of their imperial area. The treasure which the Visigoths seized in Rome in 410 (including that from the Temple in Jerusalem) was reportedly stored in Toulouse at the time. The Visigoths blended Roman and Gothic cultures, preserving Roman law in the 506 Breviary of Alaric (applying to the Visigoths and the local Roman population). The Visigothic kingdom of Toulouse was reportedly more Romanized and its state structure more elaborate than the Frankish kingdom north of the Loire Valley.

Under Clovis the Franks converted to Catholicism, receiving support from bishops opposing the Visigoths' Arianism and marching south to the northern borders of the Visigothic kingdom. War followed, and the Visigothic king Alaric II was defeated by Clovis at the Battle of Vouillé in 507. The Franks moved south, conquered Aquitania and captured Toulouse in 508. The Visigoths withdrew to Iberia, moving their capital to Toledo. Toulouse became part of Aquitaine, a smaller city in the Frankish kingdom.

== 508–768: Merovingian Franks and the duchy of Aquitaine ==
After the Frankish conquest, Toulouse began a period of decline and anarchy. Poor weather, plagues, demographic collapse and the decline of education and culture were common in the Frankish lands during the sixth and seventh centuries. Following Clovis' death in 511, Aquitaine and the rest of the kingdom were divided between his sons (the Merovingian dynasty). The Merovingian kings fought each other for control of the Frankish realm. Aquitaine was loosely controlled by Frankish kings, who delegated dukes to control the region in their name. In 680, the Duchy of Vasconia (founded 602) and Aquitaine merged under the first independent duke of Aquitaine: Felix, a Roman patrician from Toulouse. The Merovingian monarchy was weakened, and an independent local dynasty of dukes emerged in Aquitaine. Unrecognized by the Merovingians, they ruled as kings in Aquitaine (including the Basque-speaking area of Gascony south of the Garonne) with their capital Toulouse.

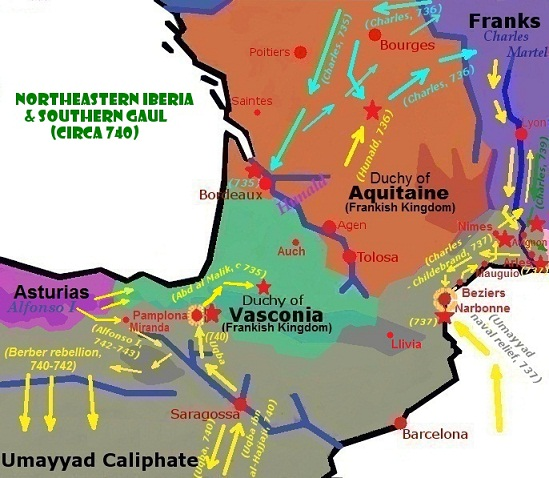
Charles Martel's campaigns in Aquitaine, Septimania and Provence (735-742)

During the early eighth century the Arabs appeared in the region from the Mediterranean coast of Spain, capturing Narbonne from the last Visigoths in 719. Al-Samh ibn Malik al-Khawlani, wali (governor) of al-Andalus (Muslim Spain), mustered a strong army from North Africa, Syria and Yemen to conquer Aquitaine. Moving west from Narbonne, he besieged Toulouse. After three months, as the city was about to surrender, Duke Odo of Aquitaine (also known as Eudes)—who had left the city to find help—returned with an army and defeated the Arabs in the Battle of Toulouse on 9 June 721. Charles Martel refused to help, wishing to take advantage of the situation to recover Aquitaine, and Odo led an army of Aquitanians and Franks to fight the Arabs. The Battle of Toulouse was a crushing defeat for the Arabs; the army scattered, most of the soldiers were killed, al-Samh died of his wounds and the remainder of the Arab troops (under Abd al-Rahman al-Ghafiqi) fled back to Narbonne. It is noted by Arab historians as the major check of Arab westward expansion.

Before 730 Odo allied with the Muslim ruler of Catalonia, Uthman ibn Naissa (also known as Munuza). The greatest threat to Duke Odo was his Frankish neighbor in the north. Odo married his daughter to Munuza and Arab raids in Aquitaine temporarily ended, enabling him to focus on the northern threat. In 731 Munuza rebelled against the new wali of al-Andalus, Abd al-Rahman al-Ghafiqi. Abd al-Rahman defeated him, and to punish Odo for his alliance he launched a raid on Aquitaine. Remembering the Battle of Toulouse, he crossed the Pyrenees west of the city and defeated Odo's army in Bordeaux. With Bordeaux captured, the Arabs moved north towards the sacred Frankish abbey of Tours. Odo requested Frankish help; Charles Martel, leader of the Franks, mustered an army and met the Arabs near Poitiers. On 25 October 732, at the Battle of Poitiers, the Arabs were defeated and Abd al-Rahman died on the field. The scholars of Charlemagne, grandson of Charles Martel, extensively chronicled the battle.

After the Battle of Poitiers, Odo was obligated to pay homage to Charles Martel and recognize Frankish authority. The Franks were busy in Burgundy and did not move further south, leaving Odo independent until his death in 735. He was succeeded by his son, Duke Hunald I of Aquitaine (also known as Hunold and Hunaud). Hunald refused to recognize Charles Martel, who sent his troops south and captured Bordeaux in 736. Hunald was forced to accept Frankish authority, and Martel withdrew his troops from Aquitaine to attack Arab holdings on the Mediterranean coast near Narbonne. In 741 Charles Martel died and was succeeded by his son, Pippin the Short (Pépin le Bref). Hunald again rebelled against Frankish authority the following year; after his 745 defeat, he retired to a monastery. He was succeeded by his son, Waifer of Aquitaine (also known as Waifre and Gaifier). Pippin, busy at home and sharing power with his brother, left Waifer in possession of Aquitaine and became sole ruler of the Frankish realm in 747. In 751 he deposed the last Merovingian king and was elected king of the Franks with the support of the pope, founding the Carolingian dynasty.

In 752, Pippin resumed the conquest of Arab territories on the Mediterranean coast where his father had failed. Facing local resistance, including intervention by Duke Waifer, in 759 he captured Narbonne and ended Arab rule north of the Pyrenees. Aquitaine was now surrounded by the Frankish kingdom, and in 760 Pippin began its conquest. It took the Franks eight years to subdue Aquitaine, Toulouse and Gascony; in 768, the last pockets of resistance crumbled as Duke Waifer was betrayed and murdered under mysterious circumstances. Although Aquitaine was destroyed after eight years of scorched-earth tactics by Pippin and Waifer, the region would recover under Charlemagne.

== 768–877: Carolingian Franks and the Kingdom of Aquitaine ==
Toulouse, Aquitaine and Gascony were again part of the Frankish kingdom. After his victory, Pippin the Short died in 768 and was succeeded by his sons Charlemagne and Carloman. At Pippin's death, Hunald (son of Duke Waifer) staged an insurrection against Frankish power in Aquitaine. Charlemagne intervened, defeating him. In 771 Carloman died, leaving Charlemagne sole ruler of the Frankish realm. In 778, Charlemagne led his army into Spain against the Arabs. On his way back, in Roncesvalles, Charlemagne's rear guard was attacked in the pass by Basque warriors. Realizing that the local populations were not entirely loyal to the Franks, he reorganized the region's administration; direct Frankish government was instituted, and Frankish counts (deputies of the Frankish king) were appointed in cities such as Toulouse.

In 781 Charlemagne established the Kingdom of Aquitaine, comprising Aquitaine, Gascony and the Mediterranean coast from Narbonne to Nîmes (known as Gothia), and gave the crown of Aquitaine to his three-year-old son Louis. Similar kingdoms were established in Bavaria and Lombardy to ensure the loyalty of local populations. Crowns were also given to Charlemagne's other sons, and Aquitaine was known for its independence and wealth.

Charlemagne saw that he could not trust the local nobility of Vasconia, appointing Frankish counts and creating counties (such as Fezensac) which could fight regional dukes such as Lupus. Oversight of this Basque frontier seems to have been given to Chorson, count (or duke) of Toulouse. In 787 (or 789) Chorson was captured by Odalric the Basque (probably Lupus' son), who forced him into an agreement. Charlemagne replaced him with Count William in 790.

Charlemagne's reign saw the recovery of western Europe from the preceding dark age. Toulouse was a major Carolingian military stronghold against Muslim Spain, with military campaigns launched from the city nearly every year of Charlemagne's reign. In 801, Barcelona and a large part of Catalonia were conquered. With the northern areas of Aragon and Navarre in the Pyrenees, the region became the southern (Spanish March) of the Frankish empire.

In 814, Charlemagne died. His only surviving son was Louis, king of Aquitaine, who became Emperor Louis the Pious. The kingdom of Aquitaine was transferred to Pippin, Louis' second son. Gothia was detached from Aquitaine and administered directly by the emperor, recreating the former duchy of Aquitaine. Louis had three sons, and in 817 he arranged an allocation of shares in their future inheritance. Pippin was confirmed king of Aquitaine, Louis the German was made king in Bavaria and eldest son Lothar became co-emperor (with future authority over his brothers).

In 823 Charles the Bald, Louis the Pious' son with his second wife, was born and she wished to place her son in the line of succession. Strife between his three older sons and Louis and his new wife led to the gradual collapse of the Frankish empire. In 838 Pippin I of Aquitaine died, and Louis the Pious and his wife installed Charles the Bald as king of Aquitaine. At the 839 Assembly of Worms, the empire was re-divided. Charles the Bald received the western part of the empire, Lothar the central and eastern part and Louis the German Bavaria. Pippin II of Aquitaine, son of Pippin I who was recognized as king by the Aquitanians (but not the Basques, whose Vasconia had seceded from Aquitaine), and Louis the German opposed the partitions.

Louis the Pious died in 840, Lothar claimed the empire and war broke out. Originally allied with his nephew Pippin II, Louis the German allied with his half-brother Charles the Bald and they defeated Lothar. In August 843, they signed the Treaty of Verdun. The empire was divided into three parts. Charles the Bald received the western part, Francia Occidentalis (Western Frankland, soon called France); Louis the German the eastern part, Francia Orientalis (Eastern Frankland, soon the German Holy Roman Empire), and Lothar received the central part (soon to be conquered and divided between his brothers).

Family strife left the empire weak and undefended, and the Vikings took advantage of the situation. After the Treaty of Verdun, Charles the Bald moved south to defeat Pippin II and add Aquitaine to his territory. He conquered Gothia, and in 844 besieged Toulouse before withdrawing from the city. That year the Vikings entered the Garonne River, took Bordeaux and sailed as far as Toulouse, plundering and killing throughout the valley. They withdrew from Toulouse, without attacking the city.

In 845 Charles the Bald signed a treaty with Pippin II of Aquitaine, recognizing Pippin as king of Aquitaine in exchange for Pippin's relinquishing of northern Aquitaine (the County of Poitiers) to Charles. The Aquitanians, now dissatisfied with Pippin, asked Charles to topple him in 848. The following year Charles received Toulouse from Frédelon, the count of Toulouse recently appointed by Pippin, and Charles confirmed Frédelon as count of Toulouse. Aquitaine soon submitted to Charles; in 852 Pippin was imprisoned by the Basques and handed over to Charles (who placed him in a monastery).

In 852 Frédelon of Toulouse died, and Charles appointed Frédelon's brother Raymond the new count. This began the dynasty of the counts of Toulouse, who were descendants of Count Raymond I of Toulouse. In 855, following the example of his grandfather Charlemagne, Charles the Bald recreated the kingdom of Aquitaine (without Gothia) and gave the crown to his son Charles the Child. Pippin II of Aquitaine escaped from the monastery in 854, and unsuccessfully attempted to foment an insurrection in Aquitaine. He appealed to the Vikings for help and in 864, at the head of a Viking army, unsuccessfully besieged Toulouse. The Vikings left to plunder other areas of Aquitaine and Pippin II was captured and again placed in a monastery by his uncle, where he soon died.

In 866, Charles the Child died; Charles the Bald made his other son, Louis the Stammerer, the new king of Aquitaine. By then, the central state in the kingdom of France was losing its authority. Charles was unsuccessful at containing the Vikings and local populations relied on their counts, who became the chief authorities. As their power increased, they established local dynasties. Wars began between the central authorities and the counts and between counts, which weakened defenses against the Vikings. Western Europe, France in particular, entered a new dark age which would be more disastrous than that of the sixth and seventh centuries.

Charles the Bald signed the 877 Capitulary of Quierzy, allowing counts to be succeeded by their sons, before his death four months later; this formed the basis of feudalism in western Europe. He was succeeded as king of France by his son, Louis the Stammerer, king of Aquitaine. Louis did not choose any of his sons as the new king of Aquitaine, putting an end to the kingdom. He died in 879 and was succeeded by his two sons, Louis III and Carloman. Louis III inherited northwest France, and Carloman inherited Burgundy and Aquitaine. However, from 870 to 890 central power was so weak that the counts in southern France were autonomous and Paris would not reassert its authority over the south of France for four centuries.

== 877–10th century ==
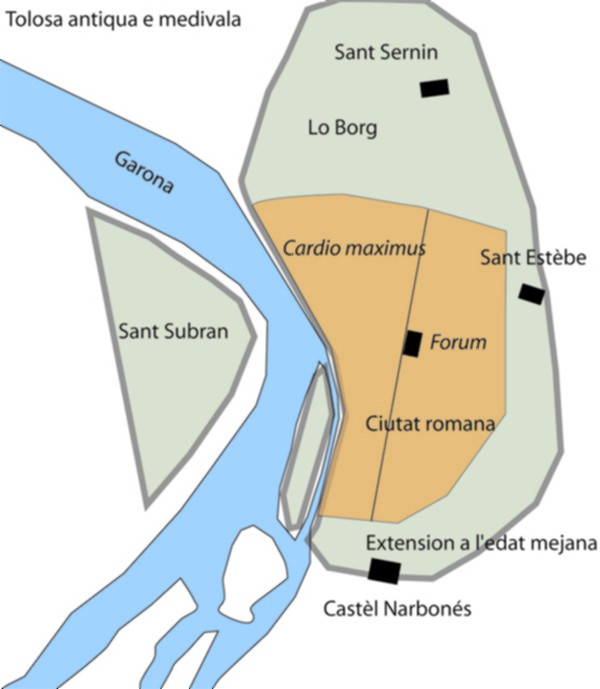
Toulouse in the early Middle Ages

By the end of the ninth century Toulouse was the capital of the county of Toulouse, and was ruled by the independent dynasty founded by Frédelon. The counts of Toulouse were challenged by those of Auvergne, who ruled the northeastern part of former Aquitaine and claimed Toulouse. The counts of Toulouse survived; although the county was a small part of the former Aquitaine, at the death of Count William the Pious of Auvergne in 918 it acquired Gothia. This doubled its territory, reuniting Toulouse with the Mediterranean coast from Narbonne to Nîmes. The county of Toulouse took shape from the city in the west to the Rhône in the east, an entity which would survive until the French Revolution as the province of Languedoc. Toulouse would never again be part of Aquitaine, whose capital would become Poitiers and then Bordeaux. William the Pious was the first to recreate the title of Duke of Aquitaine for himself during the 890s, and the count of Poitiers inherited the title in 927. In 932 King Rudolph of France, fighting the count of Poitiers, conferred the title of Duke of Aquitaine to new ally Count Raymond Pons of Toulouse.

The French throne had become a nearly empty title. After Rudolph's death, a faction crowned the English-bred Carolingian prince Louis IV from Overseas. Raymond III Pons belonged to the opposing faction, and when he died in 950 Louis IV bestowed the title of Duke of Aquitaine on Louis IV ally Count William III Towhead of Poitiers. The title of Duke of Aquitaine would be held by the family of the counts of Poitiers, whose power base at Poitou was in northwestern Aquitaine. At the death of Carolingian king of France Louis V in 987 the Robertian faction had its chief, Hugh Capet, elected to the French throne; This ended the Carolingian dynasty. Hugh Capet founded the Capetian dynasty, which would rule France for the next eight centuries.

The counts of Toulouse extended their domain to the Mediterranean coast, but their rule was short-lived. During the 10th century civilization, the arts and education had declined; a rebirth of culture and order during the reign of Charlemagne was smothered by Viking invasions, augmented by poor weather and plagues which contributed to population loss. Large areas of western Europe returned to wilderness, and cities were depopulated. Churches were abandoned or plundered; Christianity lost much of its moral authority, although Roman culture survived in scattered monasteries. This contrasted with the flourishing emirate of Córdoba in Spain and the Byzantine Empire. Authority decentralized, falling from counts to viscounts to thousands of local feudal lords. By the end of the century, France was governed by thousands of local rulers who controlled one town or one castle and a few surrounding villages. Between 900 and 980 the counts of Toulouse gradually lost control to local dynastic rulers, and by 1000 ruled only a few scattered estates; the city was ruled by a viscount, independent of the counts.

Invasions had also resumed. Emir of Córdoba Abd al-Rahman III reunited Muslim Spain and brought the emirate to its zenith, transforming it into the caliphate of Córdoba in 929. During the 920s, he launched an offensive against the Christian kingdoms in northern Spain. In 920 one of Abd al-Rahman's armies crossed the Pyrenees, reaching Toulouse without capturing the city. Four years later, the Magyars launched a westward expedition and reached Toulouse before their defeat by Count Raymond III Pons. By the end of the 10th century, the Carolingian wars and subsequent invasions had left the county in disarray. Land was left uncultivated, and many farms were abandoned. Toulouse's proximity to Muslim Spain gave it a flow of knowledge and culture from the schools and printing houses of Córdoba, and it had retained more of the Roman legacy than northern France.

== 11th century ==
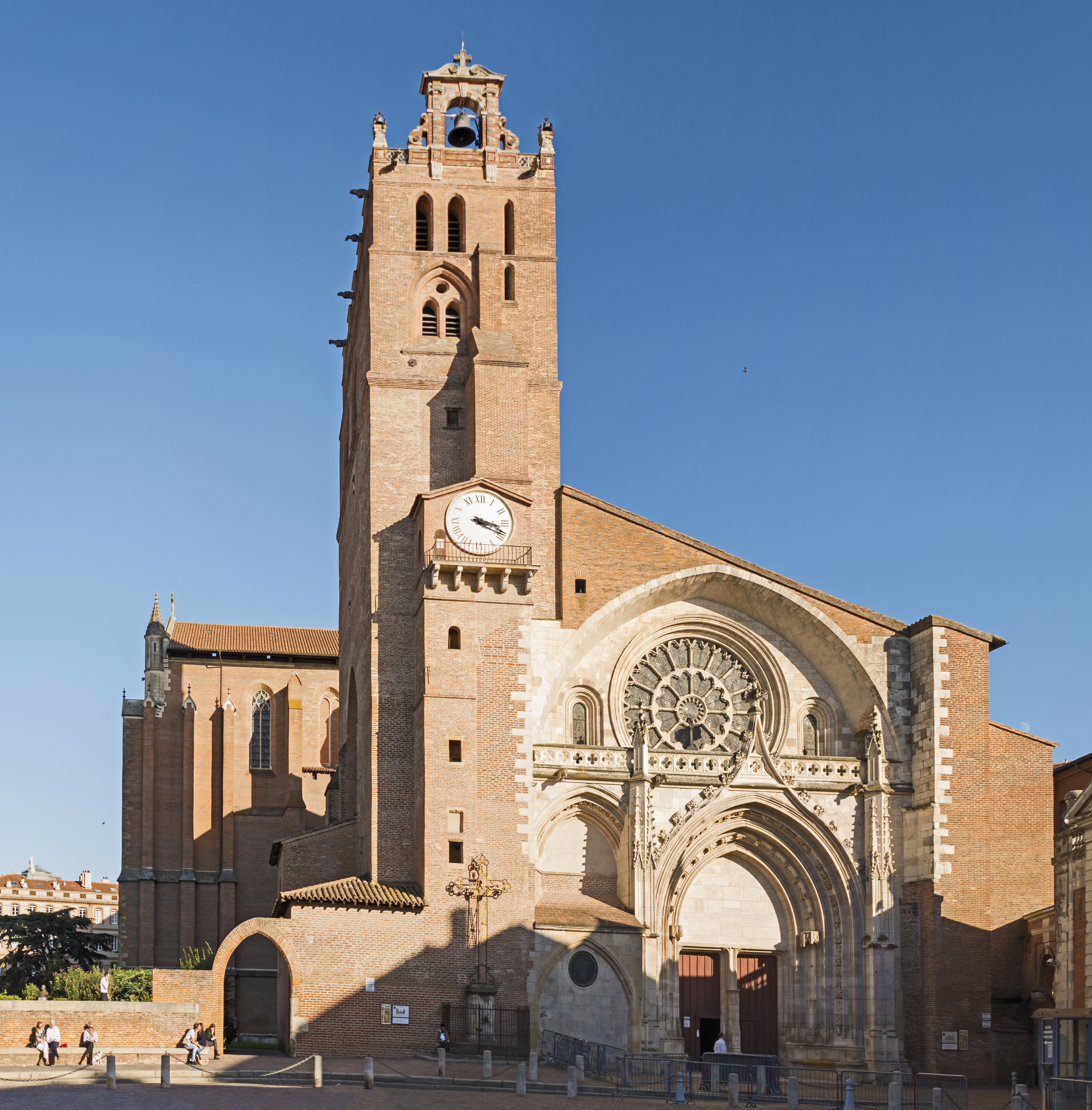
Saint-Étienne Cathedral

At the beginning of the millennium, the church was co-opted by the Toulouse administration; the Saint-Sernin church, the Daurade basilica and the Saint-Étienne cathedral were not maintained properly, and the Cluniac Reforms began. Bishop Isarn, aided by Pope Gregory VII, gave the Daurade Basilica to the Cluniac abbots in 1077. In Saint-Sernin he was opposed by Raimond Gayrard, a provost who had built a hospital for the poor and wanted to build a basilica. Supported by Count Guilhem IV, Gayrard received permission from Pope Urban II to dedicate the basilica in 1096.

During this period Toulouse developed more efficient agricultural methods; the suburbs of Saint-Michel and Saint-Cyprien were built and Saint-Sernin and Saint-Pierre des Cuisines developed. The Daurade bridge, connecting Saint-Cyprien to the city, was built in 1181.

== 12th century ==
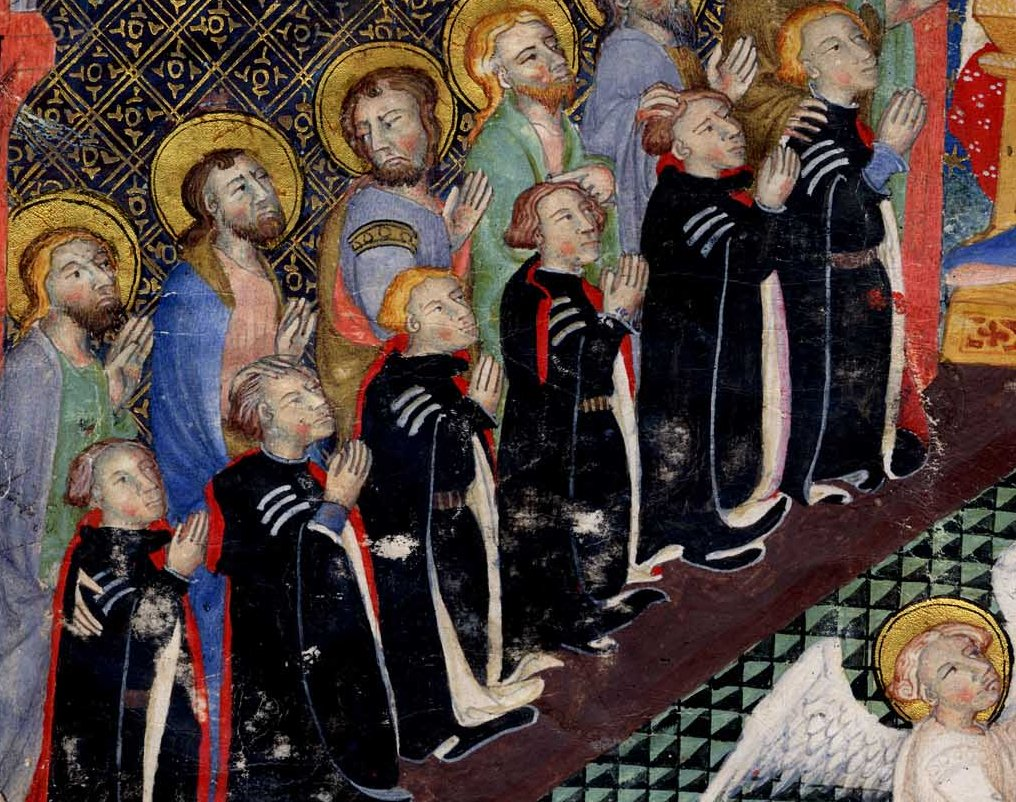
The capitouls held an exceptional collection of their portraits in the municipal annals.

The end of the 11th century marked the departure of count Raymond IV for the Crusades. Wars of succession followed, and Toulouse was besieged several times. In 1119 the city's population proclaimed Alphonse Jourdain count, and Jourdain reduced their taxes in gratitude.

At his death, an administration of eight capitulaires was created. Under the direction of the count, they regulated commerce and enforced the law. The first acts of the city's consuls (named capitouls from the 13th century onwards) date to 1152.

In 1176 the chapitre had 12 members, each representing a district of Toulouse. The consuls opposed Count Raimond V; the city's population was divided, and in 1189 (after 10 years of fighting) the count submitted to the town council.

Construction of the Capitole de Toulouse began in 1190. With 24 members, the capitouls gave themselves the rights of law enforcement, commerce and taxation. The capitouls gave Toulouse relative independence for nearly 600 years, until the French Revolution.

== 13th century ==
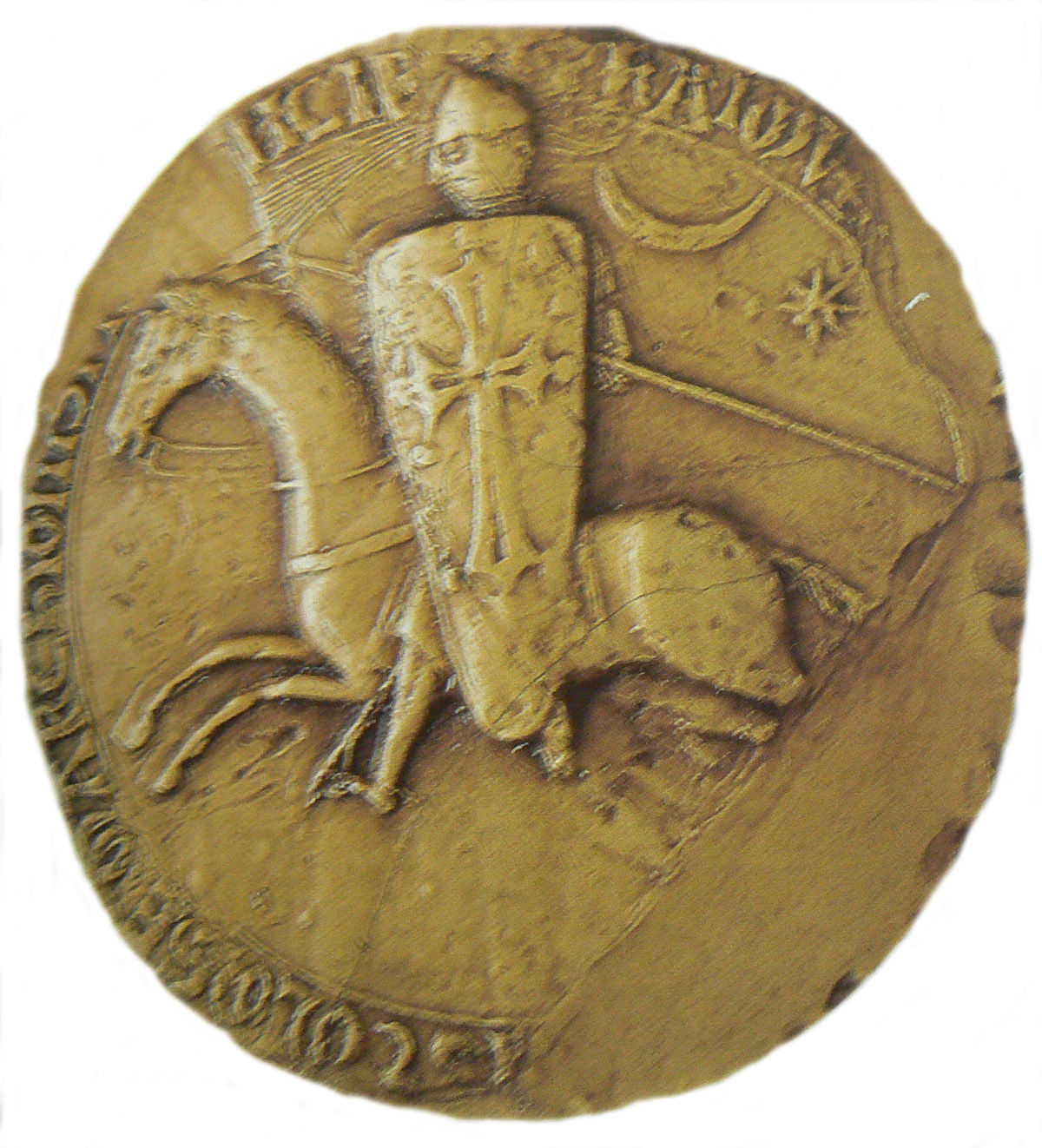
Raymond VI, Count of Toulouse

Catharism was a Christian movement espousing the separation of the material and the spiritual, partially inspired by the Bogomils of Bulgaria. Accused of heresy, the Cathars had a large following in the south of France; during the 12th century. Mandated by the Pope, Simon de Montfort tried to exterminate them.

The bishop Foulques, who fought against the cathar heresy, encouraged the Albigensian Crusade and rebuilt the Toulouse Cathedral, making it the very first example of a militant architecture designed for preaching and to restore the image of the Catholic Church: the Southern French Gothic. The consuls, unwilling to encourage the city's division, defied the Pope and refused to identify the heretics. Raymond VI, Count of Toulouse, an excommunicated Catholic, sympathised with the heretics because of the massacre at Béziers.

Although Simon de Montfort's first siege of Toulouse in 1211 was unsuccessful, two years later he defeated the city's army. With many hostages, he entered the city in 1216 and appointed himself as count. De Montfort was killed by a stone at the Siege of Toulouse in 1218. Until the final siege, the "whites" were opposed by the city's populace and Louis VII relented in 1219. Raymond VI, recognizing his support from the population (which helped him preserve his interests), gave his last prerogatives to the Capitouls.

== 13th to 14th century ==
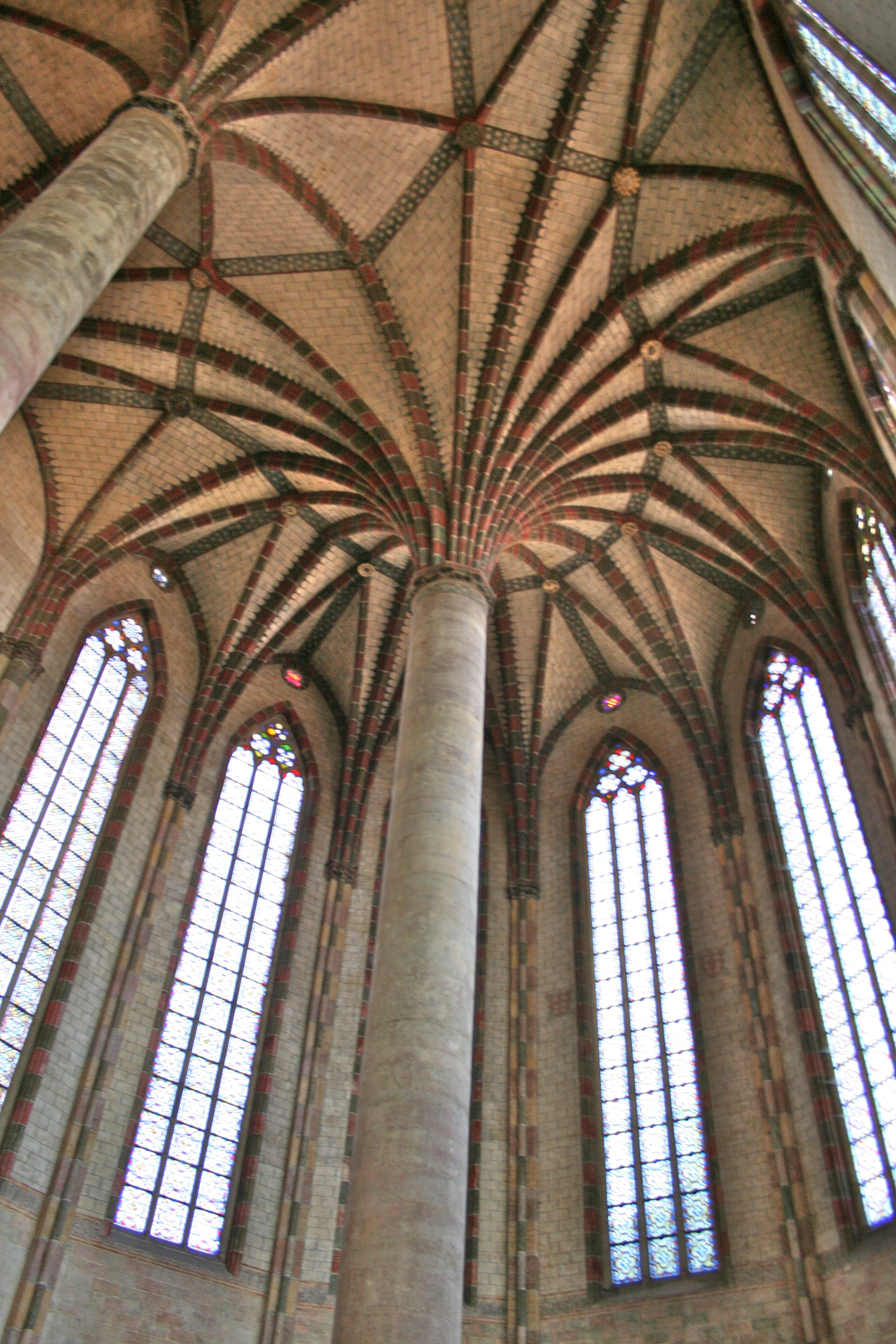
Couvent des Jacobins de Toulouse

The fight of the Catholic Church against Catharism had several consequences for Toulouse: in 1215 Saint Dominic founded the Order of Preachers there. The 1229 Treaty of Paris introduced the University of Toulouse, which aimed to teach theology and Aristotelian philosophy. Copied from the Parisian model, its curriculum was intended to combat heresy. Then, a nearly four-century inquisition (with suspected persons driven into exile or to conversion) began, centred in the city.

Convicted of heresy, Count Raimond VII died in 1249 without an heir; the county passed to the King of France, and the Capitouls' power weakened. In 1321, the Jews of Toulouse were victims of a massacre during the Shepherds' Crusade, during which homes in the Jewish Quarter were ransacked and those who refused to be baptized were killed. In 1323, the Consistori del Gay Saber was established in Toulouse to preserve the lyric art of the troubadours. Toulouse was the centre of Occitan literary culture for the next hundred years, and the Consistori existed until 1484. The city grew richer, active in the trade of Bordeaux wine, cereals and textiles with England. In addition to the inquisition, plague, fire, flood and the Hundred Years' War decimated Toulouse. Despite immigration the city's population declined by 10,000 in 70 years, and Toulouse had a population of 22,000 in 1405.

In 1368 Pope Urban V decreed that the remains of famous philosopher and theologian Thomas Aquinas be transferred to the Church of the Jacobins of Toulouse, considered to be the mother church of the Dominican Order.

== 15th to 16th century ==
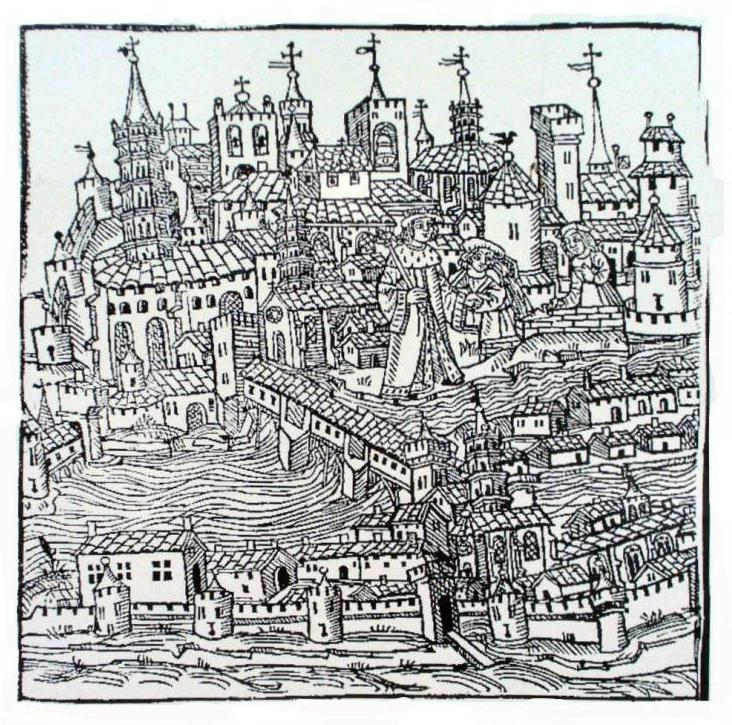
Civitas Tholosa, Nicolas Bertrand, 1515

The 15th century began with the creation of the Parlement of Toulouse by Charles VII, making Toulouse the judicial capital of much of southern France until the French Revolution. Promising exemption from taxes, the king reinforced his influence and defied the Capitouls.

Many food shortages occurred at this time. The roads were unreliable, and Toulouse experienced a major fire in 1463; buildings between the current rue Alsace-Lorraine and the Garonne were destroyed. The city's population increased, resulting in a housing shortage.

Beginning in 1463, trade in blue dye (woad) flourished. The dye, known at the time as "pastel", triggered a period of great prosperity. Toulouse used its new wealth to build the homes and public buildings that are today the core of the old city.

But in 1562 the French Wars of Religion began, disorganizing the trade, and moreover woad was eclipsed by indigo from India, which produced a darker, more-colorfast blue.

In the mid-16th century, the University of Toulouse had nearly 10,000 students. It was a centre of humanistic ferment, as the inquisition continued burning people at the stake. During the 1562 Riots of Toulouse, battles between Huguenots and Catholics resulted in over 3,000 deaths and the arson of 200 homes in the Saint-Georges quarter.

== 17th century ==
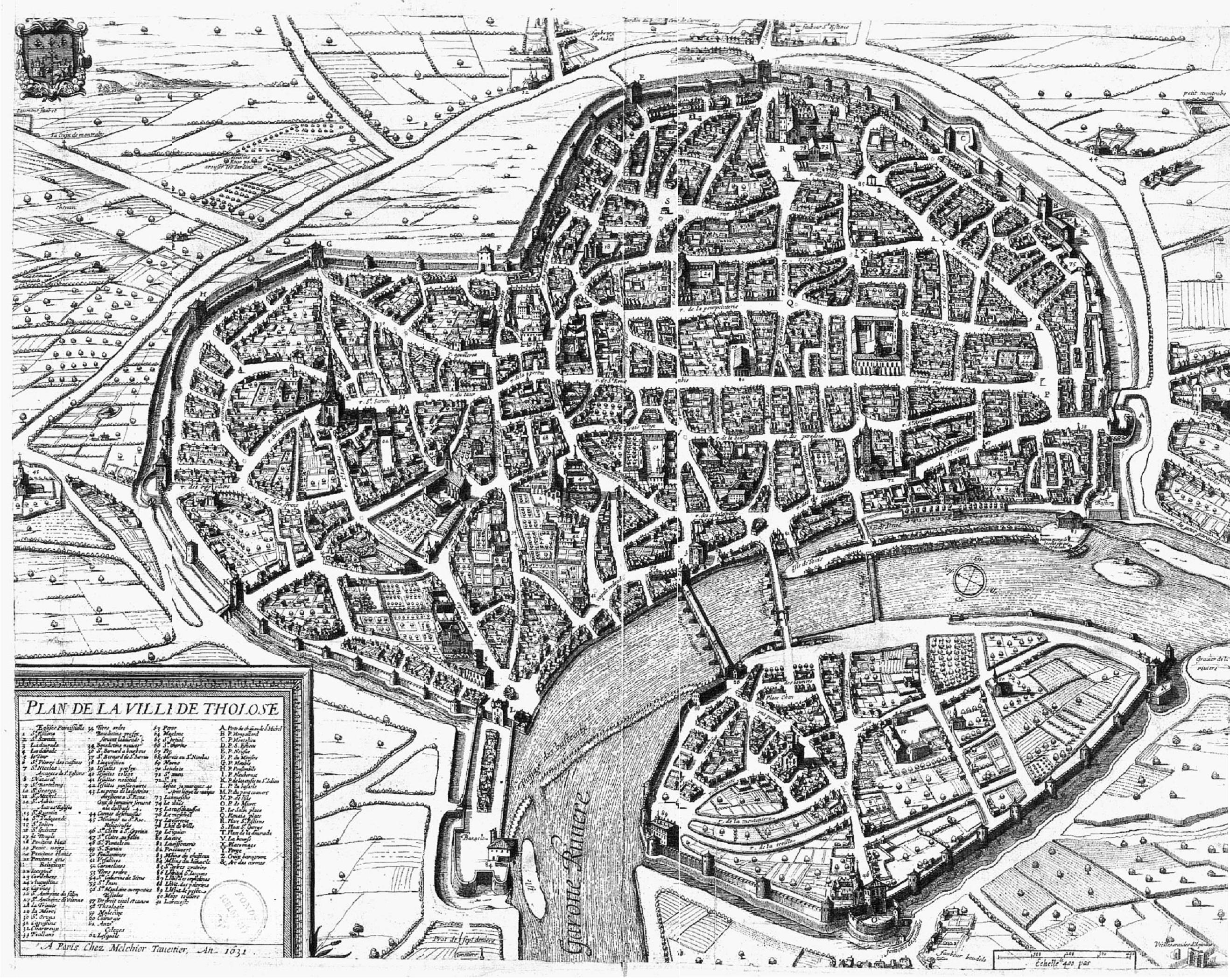
Tavernier's 1631 plan of the city

When Henry IV acceded to the throne, disorder ended in Toulouse. The parlement recognized the King of France, the edict of Nantes was accepted in 1600 and the Capitouls lost their remaining influence they had. A threat more serious than the Fronde reached Toulouse in 1629 and 1652: plague.

For the first time, the city and the local parlement cooperated to assist those affected by the epidemic. Most of the clergy and the wealthy left the city, but doctors were required to stay. Starvation led the remaining Capitouls to prevent the butchers and bakers from leaving.

La Grave Hospital accommodated those affected by the epidemic, quarantining them. The Pré des Sept Deniers also accepted many patients under hazardous conditions. Before closing its gates, the city attracted the poor with a medical infrastructure offering more hope than the countryside.

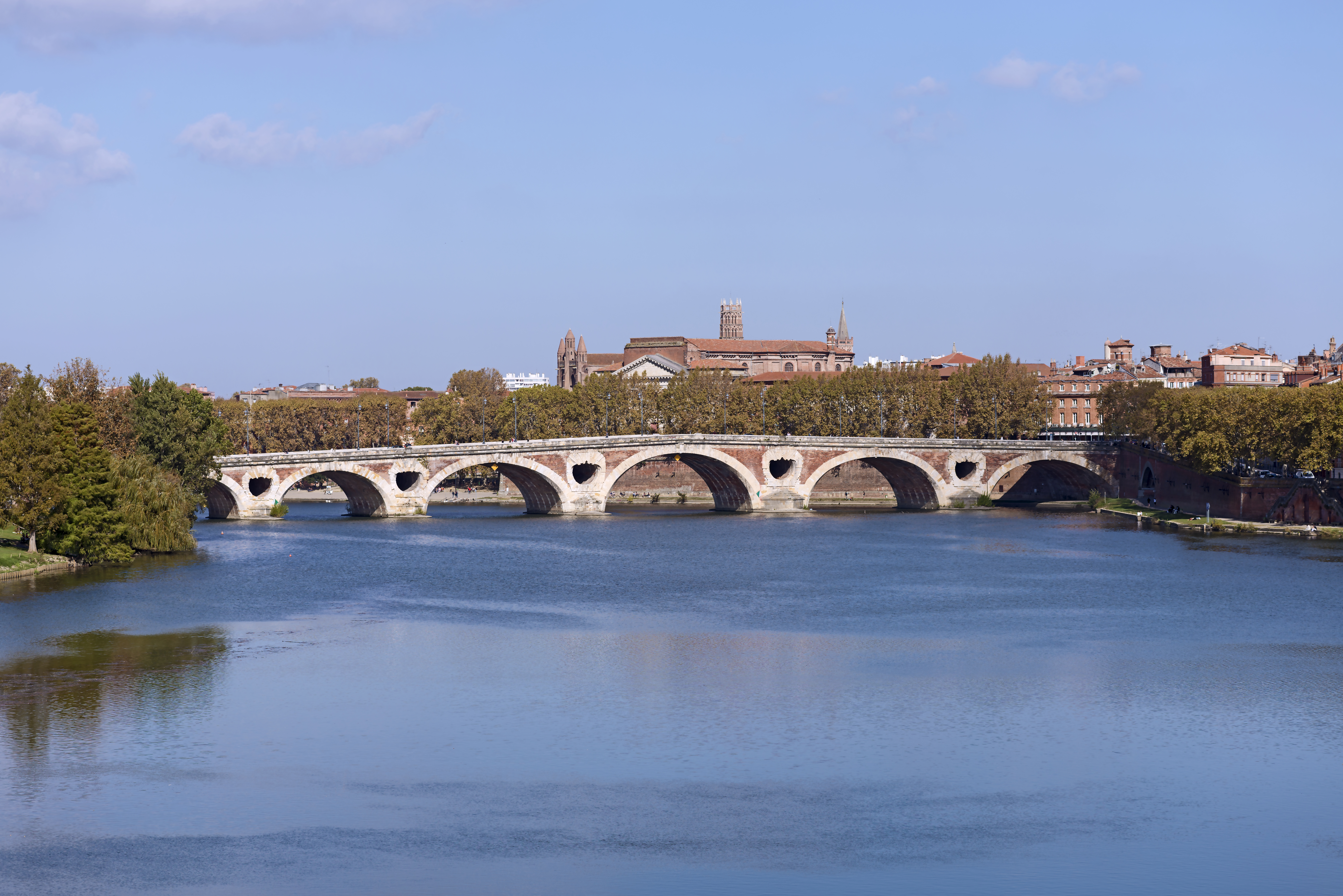
Pont-Neuf de Toulouse

In 1654, when the second epidemic ended, the city was devastated. However, during plague-free periods two major projects were completed: the Pont-Neuf in 1632 and the Canal du Midi in 1682. Famine occurred in 1693.

== 18th century ==
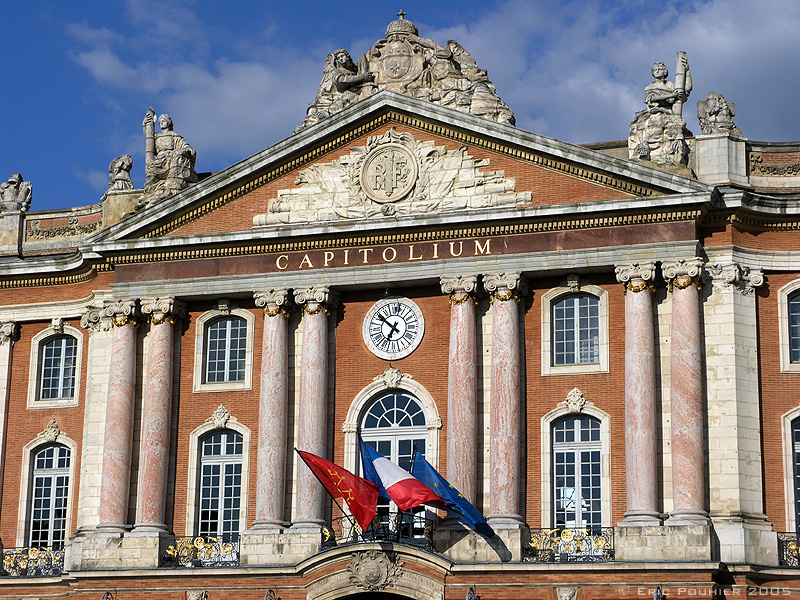
Front of the Capitole

Louis de Mondran, inspired by his stay in Paris, was the new city planner. Principal achievements of this period were the Grand Rond, the Cours Dillon, and the facade of the Capitole, completed in 1760.

In 1770, the Cardinal of Brienne laid the first stone of the channel named for him. The channel, connecting the Mediterranean Sea to the Atlantic Ocean and the Canal du Midi to the Canal Lateral à la Garonne, was finished six years later. Their confluence is known as Ponts-Jumeaux.

Economic inequality increased, with work for local architects and sculptors. The Reynerie was the summer residence of the husband of the Comtesse du Barry.

At the end of the century, the Blue Penitents worshiped at the Saint-Jérome church. The local parlement condemned the Protestants, exercising its power in the trial and execution of Jean Calas. Toulouse's population supported the parlement when it felt threatened by the monarchy, and the eight Capitouls were now chosen by the parlement.

== 19th century ==
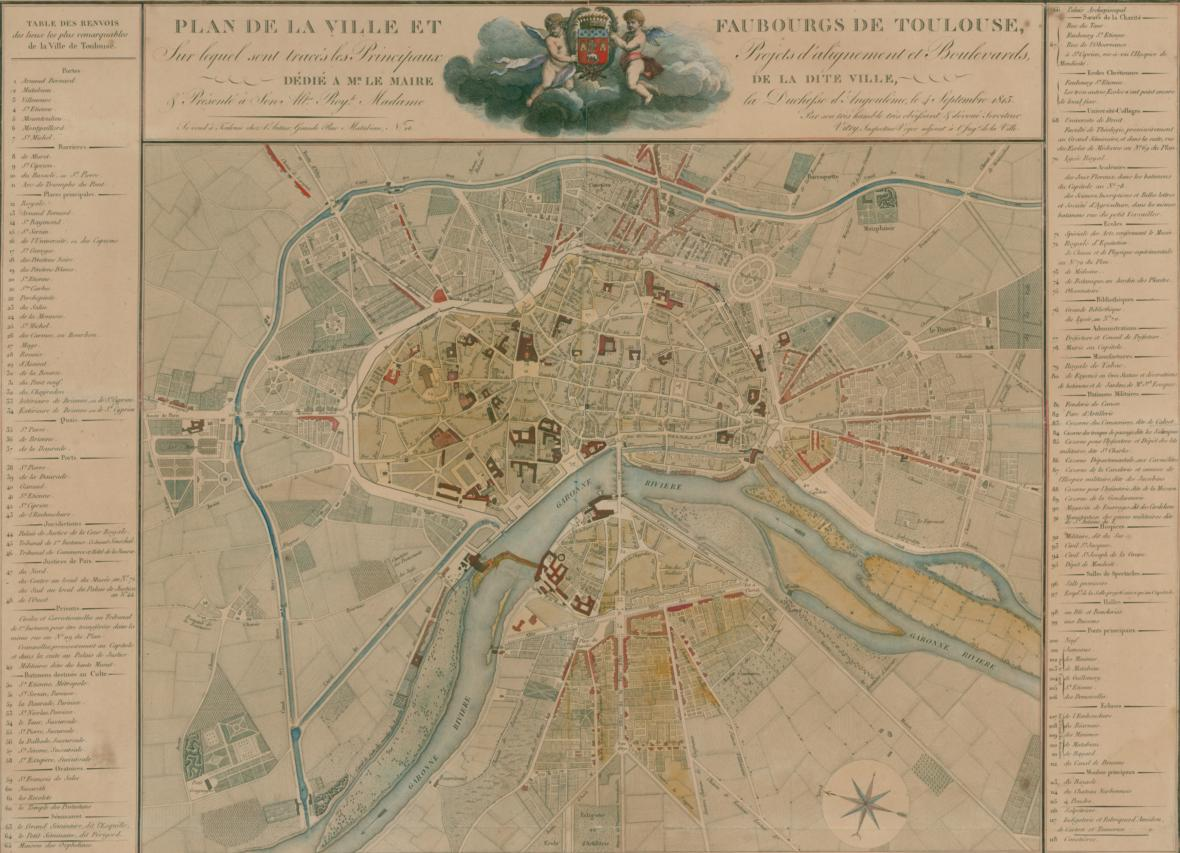
Toulouse and its faubourgs in 1815

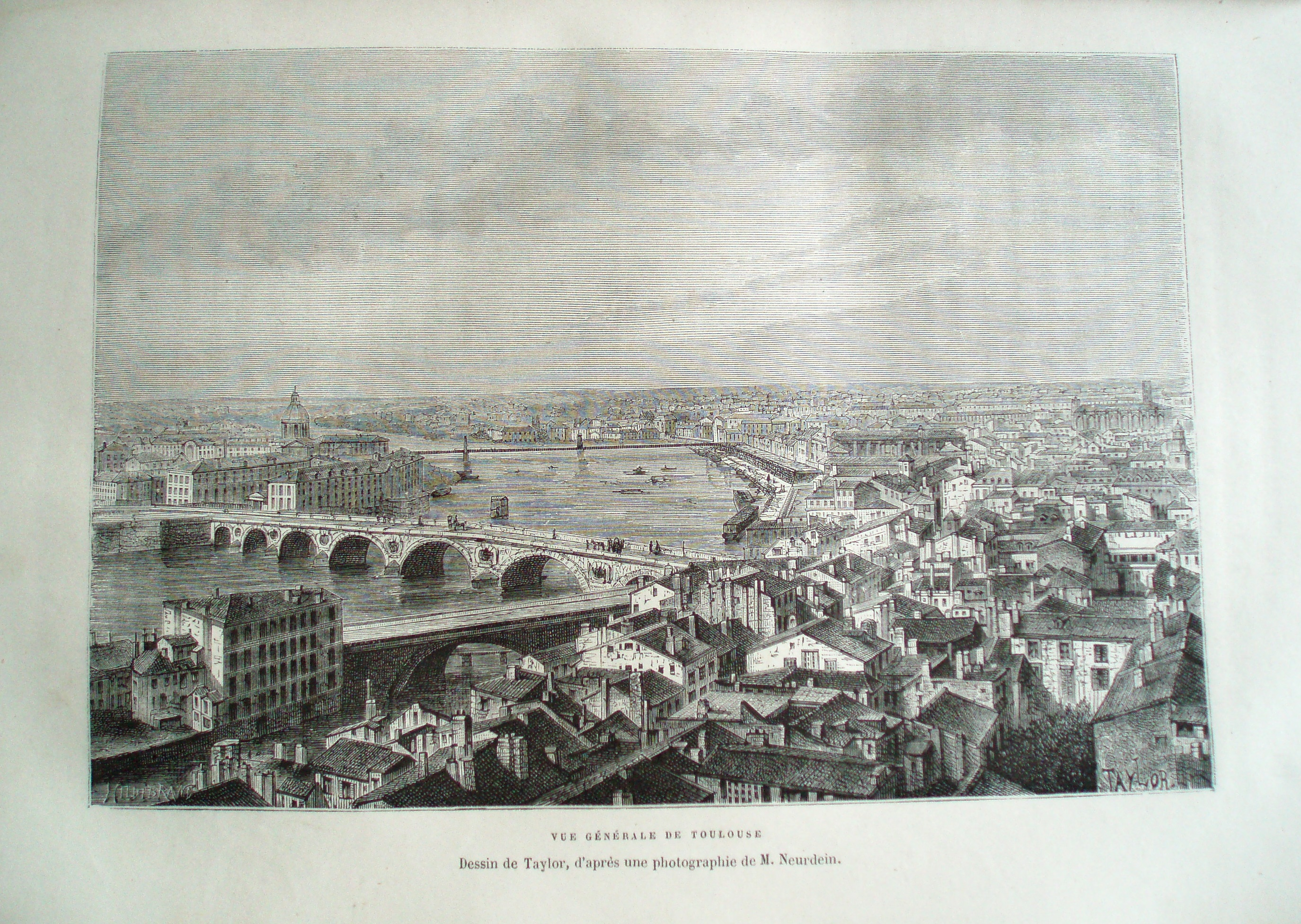
Downtown Toulouse and the Garonne in 1877

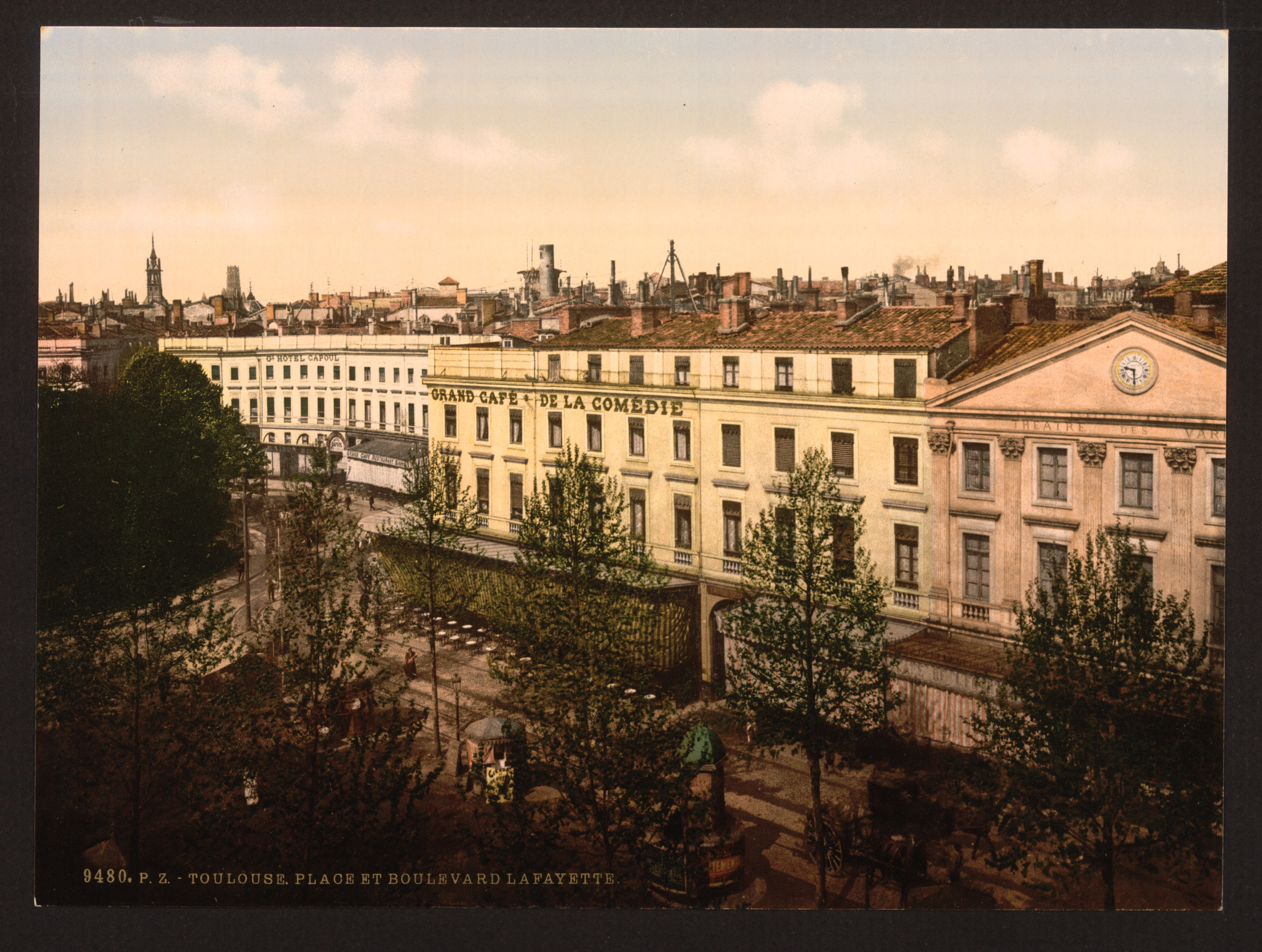
Grand Cafe de la Comedie at Lafayette in 1905

The French Revolution changed Toulouse's role and its political and social structure. The city marked the Parisian movement with looting. Five months later, when the Ancien Régime was abolished, parlement and the Capitouls received little popular support.

Toulouse's regional influence was reduced to the department of Haute-Garonne. Clergy were required to observe the Civil Constitution of the Clergy, imposed by the National Constituent Assembly. A new archbishop was named, over the objections of Loménie de Brienne. The Capitouls were abolished on 14 December 1789; Joseph de Rigaud was Toulouse's first mayor, elected on 28 February 1790.

In 1793, during the Paris Commune, Toulouse refused to join the Provence and Aquitaine federalists in Paris. The prospect of war against Austria and internal resistance initiated the Reign of Terror. In 1799 the fortified city resisted attack of British and Spanish royalist armies in the first battle of Toulouse, and Napoleon visited the city in 1808.

In 1814, during the battle of Toulouse, the British army entered the city (which had been abandoned by the imperial army). It was the last battle of the Empire, since Napoleon had abdicated eight days earlier; French commander Jean-de-Dieu Soult had not been informed. Wellington's army was welcomed by royalists, preparing Toulouse for the restoration of Louis XVIII.

== 21st century ==
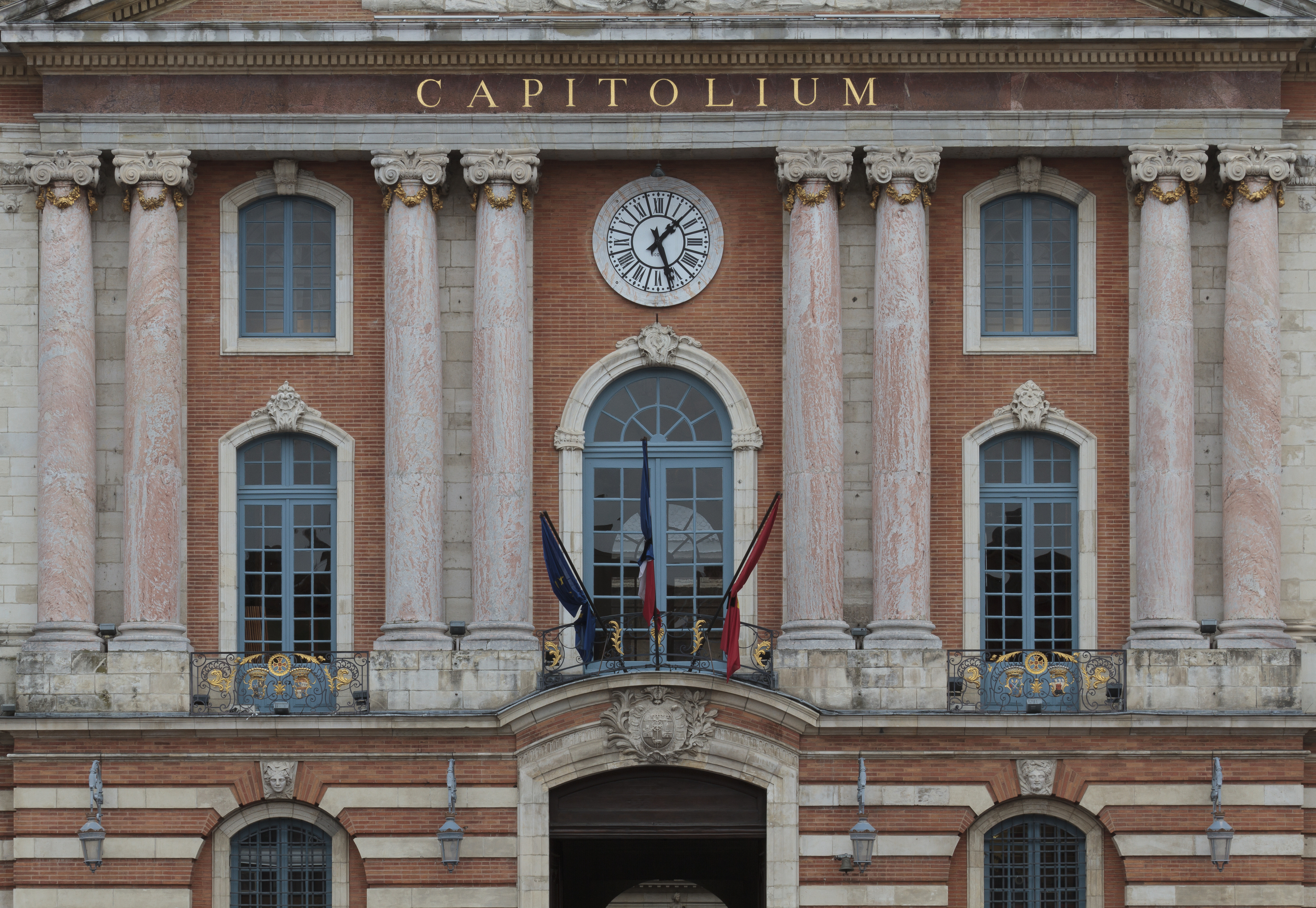
Furled flags of France, the European Union and the Midi-Pyrénées on the Toulouse Capitole after Mohammed Merah's shootings in the city

The AZF chemical plant in Toulouse exploded on 21 September 2001. The explosion, which destroyed the plant—8 km (5.0 mi) from the city centre—also damaged houses (including more than 20,000 flats), schools, churches, monuments and shops. Twenty-nine people died, and several thousand were injured. The explosion originated in a building containing ammonium nitrate.

In March 2012, local Islamic extremist Mohammed Merah killed three soldiers and seriously injured one, then opened fire at a Jewish school in Toulouse, killing a teacher and three children. One of the children, an eight-year-old girl, was shot in the head at point-blank range and a 17-year-old boy was critically wounded. President Nicolas Sarkozy called it an "obvious" antisemitic attack: "I want to say to all the leaders of the Jewish community, how close we feel to them. All of France is by their side." The Israeli Prime Minister condemned the "despicable anti-Semitic" murders. After a 32-hour siege and standoff with the police outside his house followed by a raid, Merah jumped off a balcony and was shot in the head and killed. Merah had told police during the standoff that he intended to continue attacking, and loved death as the police loved life. He claimed a connection to al-Qaeda.

== See also ==
- Counts of Toulouse
- Timeline of Toulouse
- Handwritten Annals of the City of Toulouse
