= First Council of Nîmes =

Council of Nîmes (396) was an important early Roman Catholic church Synod held in Nîmes, France on 1 October 396. It concerned the heresy of Ithacans (or Itaciens) that affected Christian unity, and resulted in the adoption of seven canons on church discipline, including the forbidding of female deaconesses.

This synod is the first of four known as the Councils of Nîmes that were held in the Middle Ages. The other Councils were held in 886, 1096, and 1284.

== Background ==
The félicien schism: Itacien was born in Trier and important cathedral in Roman Germany, when Itace and his supporters had installed Felix as bishop of the capital of Gaul. Felix, says Sulpicius Severus, was a man most holy and worthy of the episcopate but "the indignity of his ordaining, men soiled with the blood of heretics, had made his name a stumbling block" for many of the Bishops in Gaul. In 395, after the imperial government has taken in hand the transalpine countries, conciliation attempts began with the Council.

== Participants ==
The historian Louis Duchesne listed the 21 participants. It included:

- Aprunculus,
- Ursus Genialis (Cavaillon?)
- Syagrius,
- Alitius (Cahors?) Aper,
- Felix,
- Solinus,
- Adelfus,
- Remigius,
- Epetemius (Angers?),
- Modestus,
- Eusebius,
- Octavius
- Nicesius,
- Evantius,
- Ingenuus of Arles
- Aratus,
- Urbanus, and
- Melanus Toeferius

Saint Martin, sometimes accused of being antifélicien, refused to participate in the council as did many other absentees including Proculus, the Bishop of Marseilles and Simplicius of Vienna. One of the signatories, Ingenuus of Arles, the Archbishop of Arles is claimed by historian Jean-Remy Palanque, to be one of the féliciens.

== Decision ==
The Bishops of Milan and Rome wished for the condemnation of Priscillian, but it seems that they were unsuccessful. However, the council did push for the prohibition of female diaconate, who had backed priscillanistes. According to Jean-Remy Palanque, the council failed to "clear the scandals and heal discord" as he perceived it.

The synod also adopted seven canons on discipline, which were not printed until 1743.

== Controversy about the date ==
Although the date of 396 is generally accepted, some authors do not agree and suggest alternatives between 394 and 396. The council was in Nîmes on 1 October in the consular year in which Arcadio and Honorio were consul, which would indicate 394 or 396. Saint Martin is still alive at the time of the council, so it takes place prior to 397. Arguments for the year 396, are mainly based on the argument of Louis Duchesne. The latter notes that until 6 September 394, Gaul is still the power of the usurper Eugene, and it seems unlikely that such a meeting could be arranged in such a short space of timetime (between 6 September and 1 October).
