= Toulouse Congress, 1985 =

Conference of the French Socialist Party

The Toulouse Congress was the eleventh national congress of the French Socialist Party (Parti socialiste or PS). It took place from October 11 to 13, 1985. The Congress marked the party's transition to social democracy and Jacques Delors spoke of the Congress as the French Bad Godesberg.

== Results ==
Popular vote
Jospin-Mauroy-Chevènement	71.4%
Rocardians	28.6%

Lionel Jospin was re-elected as First Secretary.
