= Jean-Rémy Palanque =

Jean-Rémy Palanque (7 March 1898 in Marseille – 2 June 1988, Aix-en-Provence) was a professor of ancient history at the Faculty of Letters at Montpellier, then at the University of Aix-en-Provence.

He was a member of the Institute, the Académie des Inscriptions et Belles-Lettres (elected 15 November 1968) and president of the Society of Religious History of France. He contributed, with Henri-Irénée Marrou, to the renewal of the historical interpretation of the Roman Empire and early Christianity. He has translated and completed in French the works by the Austrian historian Ernst Stein, who was devoted to the history of late antiquity. He was awarded the Medal of the Resistance in 1945. He died in Aix-en-Provence on 2 June 1988

== Works ==
- The testimony of Socrates Scholastica on the St. Ambrose, in Journal of Classical Studies, Volume 26, No. 3 (July–September 1924), Feret, Bordeaux, 1924
- A new history of the Lower Empire, in Historical Review, Volume 164 (1930), Paris, 1930, p. 288-308
- Essay on the prefecture of the courtroom of the Lower Empire, 1933
- St. Ambrose and the Roman Empire: a contribution to the history of relations between Church and State in the late fourth century, 1935
- Jean-Remy Palanque, H. Davenson, Pierre Fabre ... [et al.], Christianity and the end of the ancient world, Editions de l'Abeille, Lyon, 1943
- Jean-Remy Palanque ... [et al.], Christianity and the barbarian West, Editions du Cerf, Paris, 1945
- The ancient imperialisms, Presses Universitaires de France, coll. "What do I know?" 1948
- Jean-Remy Palanque, Delaruelle Etienne, The Christian Gaul with Frankish period in Church history of Revue de France, tome XXXVIII, No. 131 (1952), Print. André-Pauyé Meaux 1952
- André Latreille, Delaruelle Etienne, Jean-Remy Palanque, [and Rene Remond for Volume 3] History of Catholicism in France, Spes, Paris, 1957–1962, 3 vols. (351, 501, 693 p.)
- Constantine to Charlemagne through the barbaric chaos, A. Fayard, coll. "I know – I think. Part Seven, The Church in its history, "1959
- Gallican and liberal Catholics in France against the Vatican Council, 1867-1870, Ophrys, coll. "Publications Annals of the Faculty of Letters of Aix-en-Provence. New series "Paris 1962
- Jean-Remy Palanque and John Chelini, short history of the great councils, Desclée Brouwer, coll. "Christian Presence", Paris 1962
- Michel Meslin and Jean-Remy Palanque (texts selected and introduced by), ancient Christianity, A. Colin, coll "U2. Ancient History Series "Paris 1967
- Jean-Remy Palanque (ed.), The Diocese of Marseille, Letouzey & Ané, coll. "History of the dioceses of France," Paris 1967
- Montalembert and the Marquise de Forbin d'Oppède, in Church history of Revue de France, 1970, p. 115-130
- Fernand Benoit, historian, in Journal of Ligurian Studies, No. 1-3, January–September 1967, International Institute of Ligurian Studies, Bordighera, 1973
- Jean-Remy Palanque (ed.), The Diocese of Aix-en-Provence, Beauchesne al. "History of the dioceses of France. New series "Paris 1975
- Jean-Remy Palanque, Henri-Irenee Marrou, et al, Christian Prosopography the Lower Empire, Paris et al, being published since 1982 (1: Africa (303-533), by A. Mandouze; 2:.. Italy (313-604), under the direction of C. and L. Pietri, 3:.. Asian Diocese (325-641), S. Destephen).
- Cinzia Vismara, Philippe Pergola, Jean-Remy Palanque, Vence in Roman times, Association for the Defence and Promotion of Heritage Vence, coll. "Publications for the defense and promotion of Vence heritage", (Vence, 1989).
