= Stade Richter =

French multi-purpose stadium

- Stade Richter
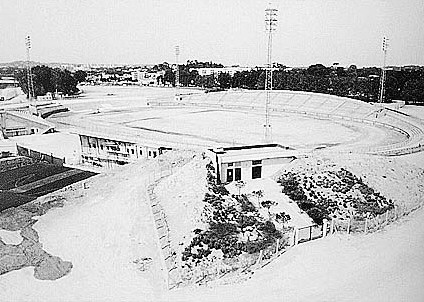
- Interactive map of Stade Richter
- Full name: Stade Richter
- Location: Montpellier, France
- Coordinates: 43°36′8″N 3°53′53″E
- Capacity: 30,000

Construction
- Built: 1968
- Closed: 1990

Tenant
- Montpellier HSC

Stade Richter was a multi-purpose stadium in Montpellier, France. The stadium held 30,000 spectators and was preceded by the Parc des Sports de l'avenue du Pont Juvénal.

It was the home ground of the Montpellier, until their current stadium, Stade de la Mosson, opened in 1972.

Even after the Stade de la Mosson opened, the Stade Richter was used for concerts, by artists including Bruce Springsteen & The E Street Band (1985), U2 (1987), Pink Floyd (1988) & Michael Jackson (1988).
