= Hôtel de Ville, Perpignan =

Town hall in Perpignan, France

Hôtel de Ville
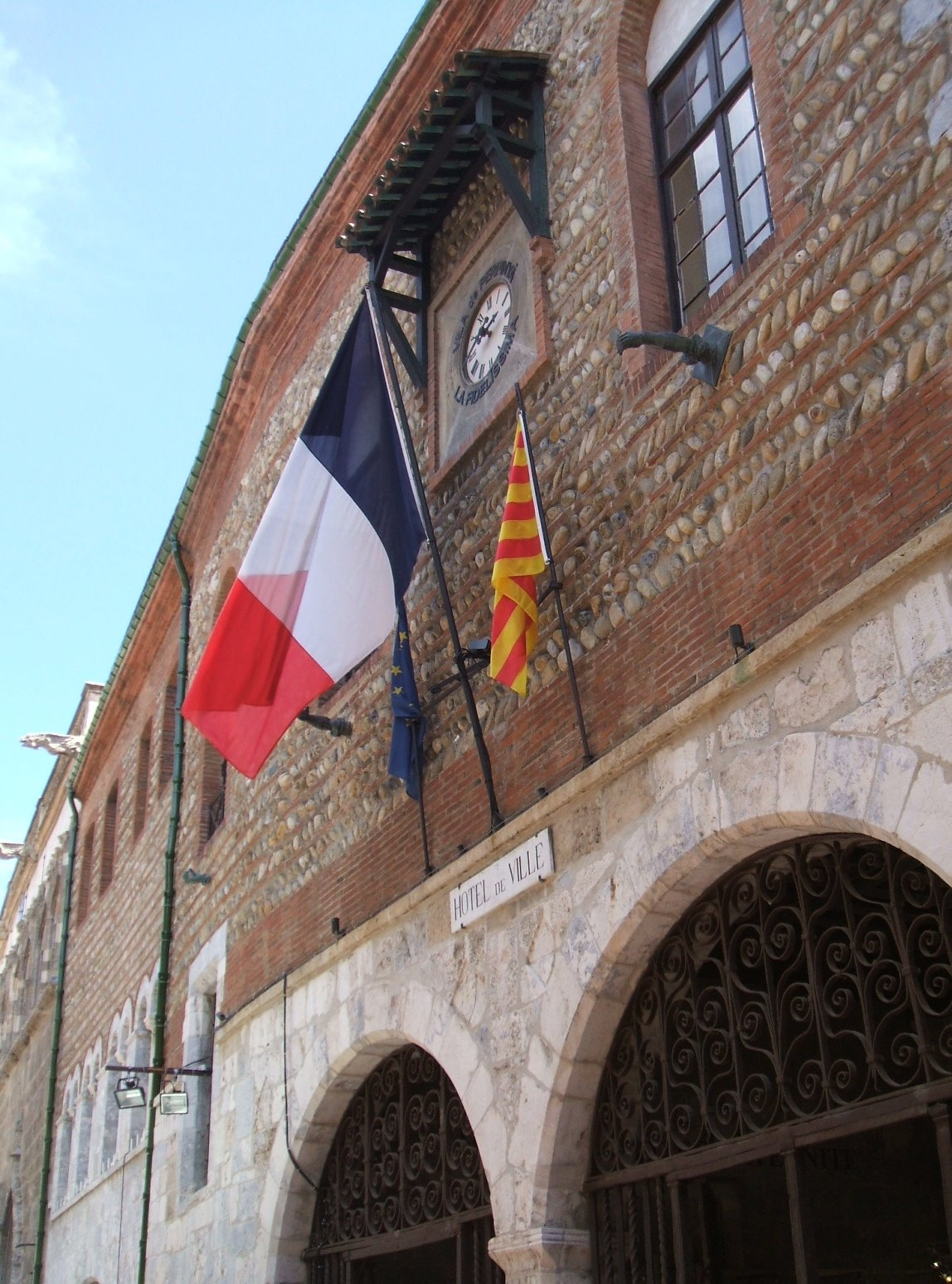
- The main frontage of the Hôtel de Ville in 2008

General information
- Type: City hall
- Architectural style: Medieval style
- Location: Perpignan, France
- Coordinates: 42.6994°N 2.8947°E
- Completed: 1318

Monument historique
- Official name: Hôtel de ville
- Type: Inscrit
- Designated: 1886
- Reference no.: PA00104079

The Hôtel de Ville (French pronunciation: [otɛl də vil], City Hall) is a municipal building in Perpignan, Pyrénées-Orientales, southern France, standing on the Place de la Loge. It was designated a monument historique by the French government in 1886.

== History ==
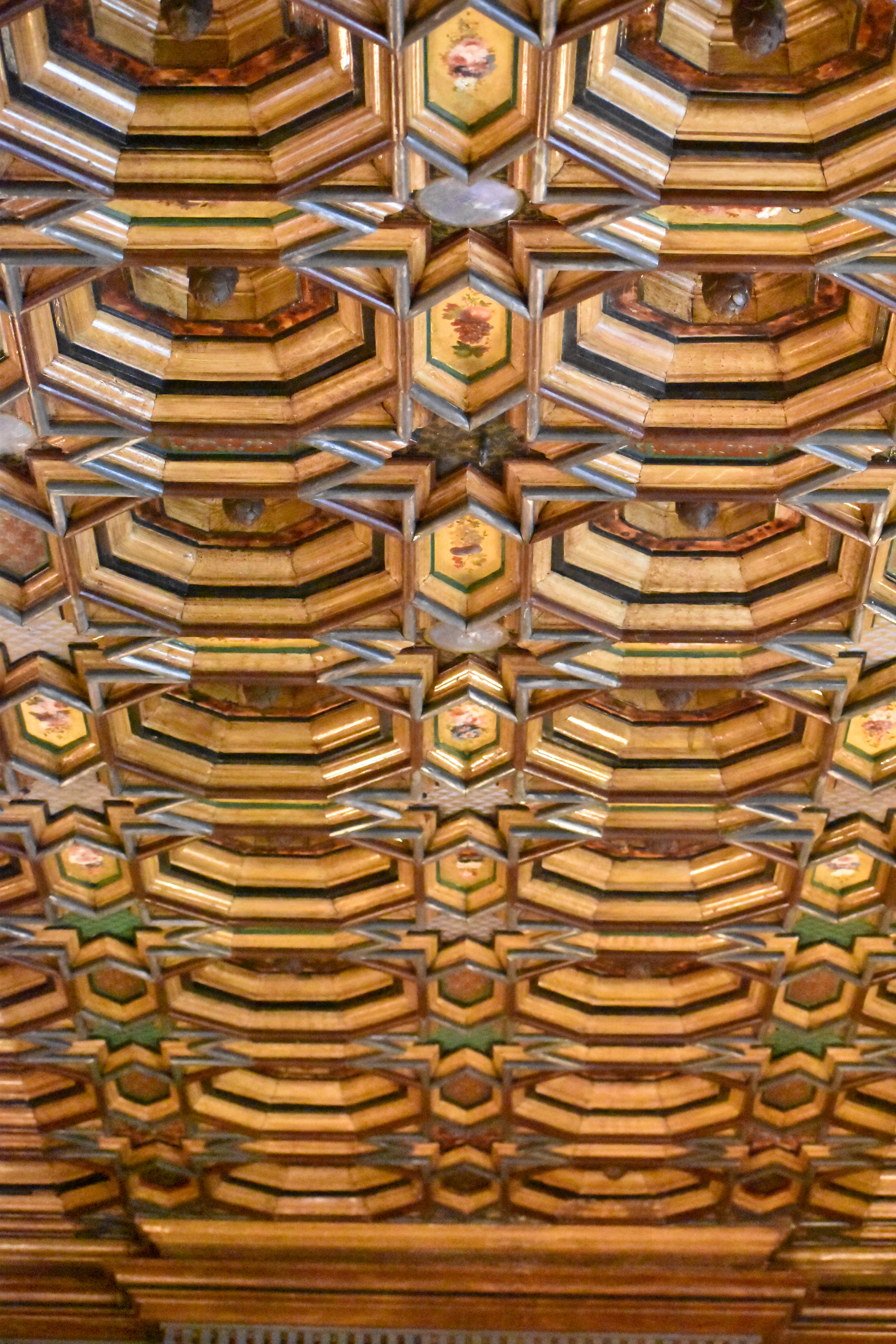
The ceiling in the wedding hall

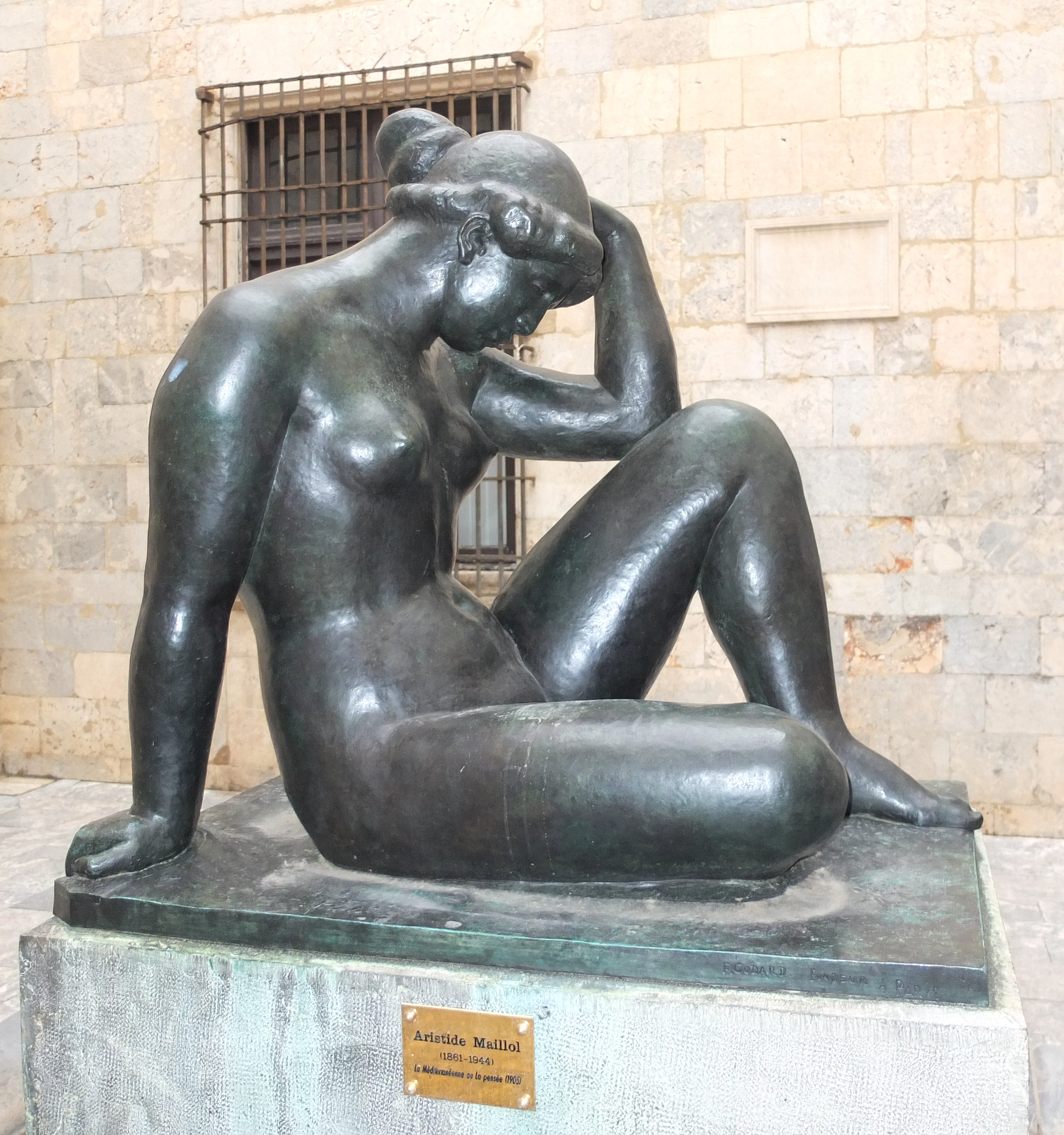
Sculpture by Aristide Maillol

The building was commissioned by local officials, the five consuls, and authorised by King Sancho, when the town formed part of the Kingdom of Majorca in the early 14th century. The site they selected was on the north side of what was originally called the Place des Hommes Riches (Place of Rich Men), which was then the centre of the local drapery industry.

The building was designed in the medieval style, built in ashlar stone and completed in 1318. The building was laid out as a trapezoid, to accommodate the confined site. It featured two semi-circular openings with iron gates on the ground floor and rows of pebbles, often found in Catalan architecture, fixed to the first-floor façade. It was fenestrated by a recessed casement window on the left of the main frontage at mezzanine level, and by three round headed windows on the first floor. Three bronze hands, which recalled the three categories of society order under the ancien régime (the bourgeoisie, the professionals and the traders) were installed below the first-floor windows. A clock with a canopy was later installed between the second and third windows on the first floor and, at roof level, there was a modillioned cornice.

Internally, the principal rooms include the wedding hall in the south-east corner of the building, which featured a ceiling decorated in the Hispano-Moorish style, which was created in the early 16th century. The room was richly redecorated in the early 19th century in anticipation of a visit by Napoleon which failed to take place. Another prominent room was the Salle Arago, which served as the council chamber for the city council and was decorated with early-20th century paintings by Henri Perrault, depicting Hannibal's crossing of the Alps in 218 BC, the oath by John II of Aragon to protect Perpignan following the Catalan Civil War in 1473, and the French victory at the Battle of Peyrestortes in 1793.

An inner courtyard was created in the centre of the building in the first half of the 16th century. A sculpture, created by Aristide Maillol depicting a female figure sitting on pedestal, and named "the Mediterranean", was installed there in 1905. Following the liberation of the town on 18 August 1944, during the Second World War, a local member of the French Resistance, Félix Mercader, having been acclaimed as mayor, took control of the town hall.
