= Councils of Nîmes =

Synods taking place in Nîmes, France

The Councils of Nîmes (Latin: Concilia Nemausensia) is the name given to a series of four religious synods that took place in Nîmes, southern France, during the Middle Ages.

The four councils took place in 394, 886, 1096, and 1284.

1. The First Council of 394 (referred to by Sulpicius Severus) resulted in the adoption of seven canons on church discipline, including the forbidding of female deaconesses.
2. The Second Council of 886 is considered to be of little historical importance.
3. The Third Council of July 1096 was presided over by Pope Urban II, and resulted in the adoption of sixteen disciplinary canons.
4. The Fourth Council of 1284 is considered to be of little historical importance.
