= Parc des Sports de l'avenue du Pont Juvénal =

Multi-use stadium in Montpellier, France

Parc des Sports
- Parc des Sports de l'avenue du Pont Juvénal
- Interactive map of Parc des Sports
- Full name: Parc des Sports de l'avenue du Pont Juvénal
- Location: Montpellier, France
- Coordinates: 43.607°N 3.887°E
- Capacity: 16,000

Construction
- Built: 1923
- Closed: 1969

Tenant
- Montpellier HSC

Parc des Sports de l'avenue du Pont Juvénal was a multi-use stadium in Montpellier, France. It was the home ground of SO Montpellier until their next stadium Stade Richter opened in 1968.
