= Touring Club de France =

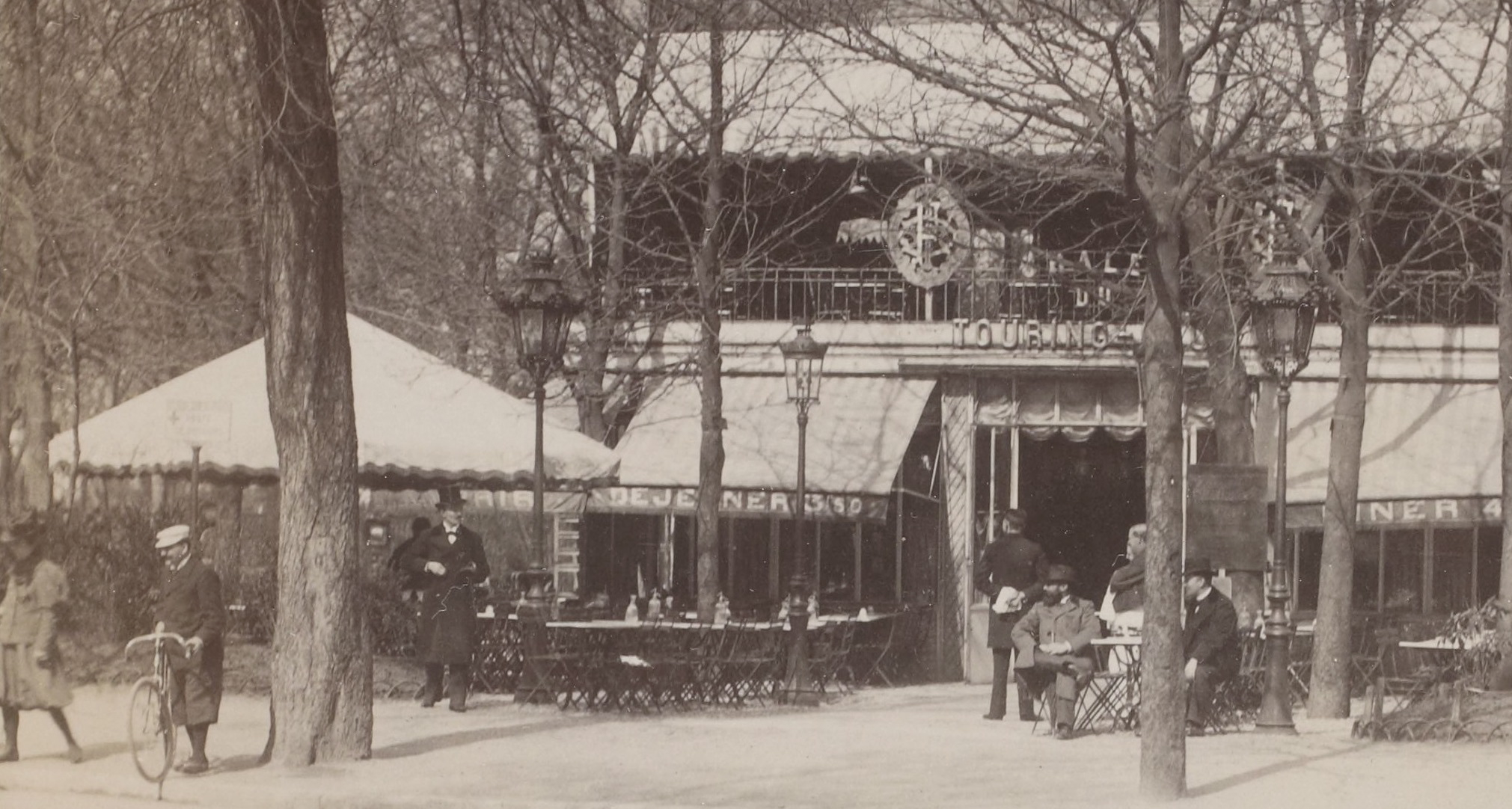
Chalet du Touring Club in the Bois de Boulogne, Paris, 1898

The Touring Club de France (1890-1983) was a French social club devoted to travel, founded by enthusiasts of the velocipede. Its headquarters sat on the Avenue de la Grande Armée in Paris.

== History ==
The idea of the Touring Club de France was inspired by the British Cyclists' Touring Club, founded in 1873 and also devoted to cycling, and promoted in France under the impulse of Paul de Vivie.

The archives of the Touring Club de France were given in 1984 to the French National Archives (number 53 AS).

== Prize ==
The Touring Club de France used to award several prizes to support mountain guides fathers of large families. The Jean S. Barès Prize was awarded to mountain guides from the Pyrénées, living above an altitude of 500 meters and raising at least seven children, all born at that altitude or above. The recipient of that prize in 1928 was Pierre Mayneris, a mountain guide from Baillestavy, near the Canigou, who received 2400 francs as a support to raise his nine children. The Brunier Prize was the equivalent for mountain guides living in the French Alps above an altitude of 1000 meters.

== See also ==
- Tourism in France
- Touring Club Suisse

== Bibliography ==
- "Touring Club de France", The Automobile, vol. 17, USA, 12 December 1907, OCLC 5284870
- Marie-Hélène Fusz (2000), Le Touring-Club de France (1890-1983): son rôle dans le développement de la sensibilité au patrimoine (in French)
- Médiathèque de l'Architecture et du Patrimoine. "Touring Club de France". Archives photographiques: Visites guidées (in French). Charenton-le-Pont, France: Ministre de la Culture et de la Communication.

Issued by the club

- Revue mensuelle (in French), vol. 1, Touring Club de France, 1891 – via Bibliothèque nationale de France (ongoing monthly magazine)
- À la France: sites et monuments (in French). Paris: Touring-Club de France. OCLC 457600236 – via HathiTrust. 1900-1906 (33 vols.)
