= Gaspard de Fieubet =

French Magistrate

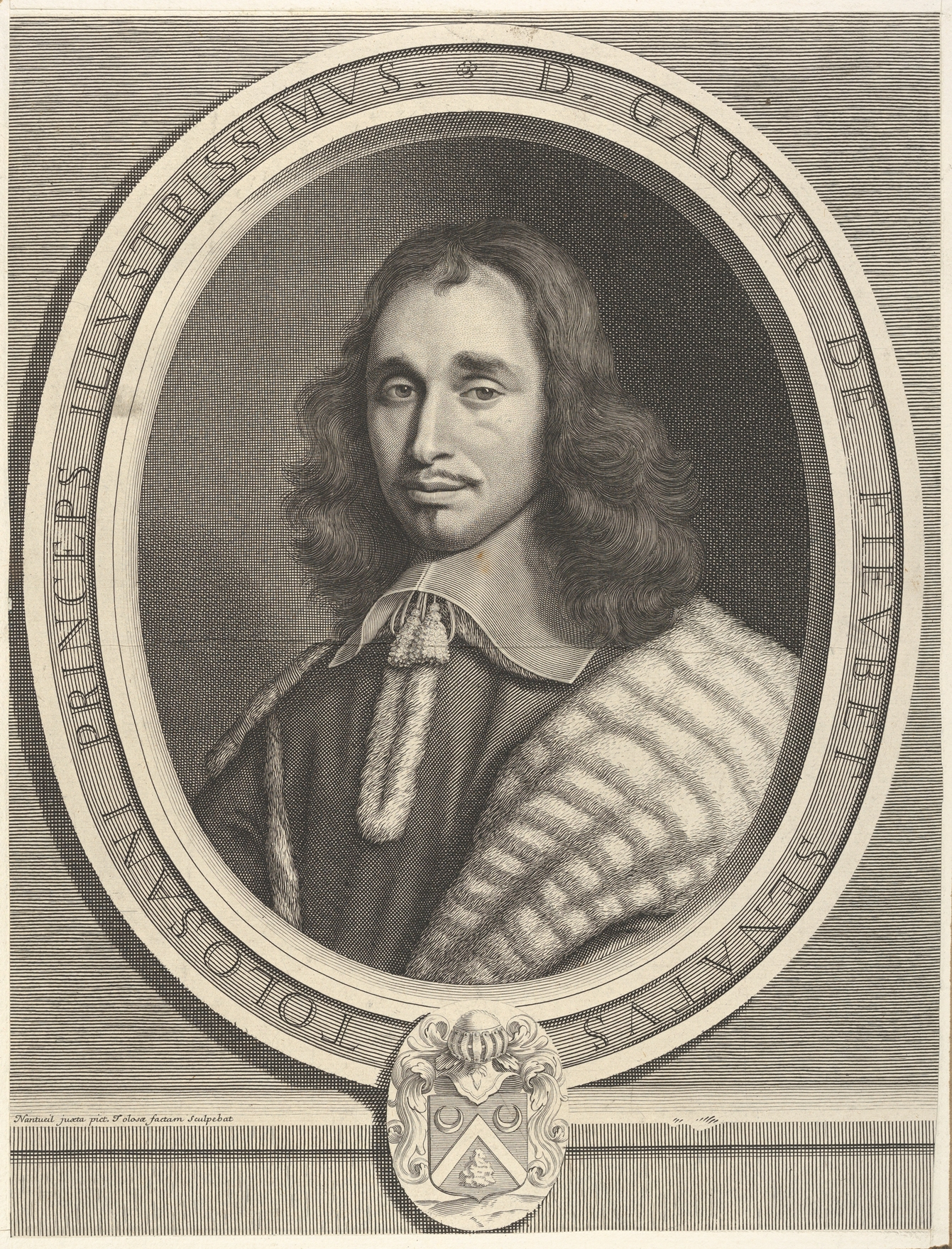
- Engraving by Robert Nanteuil, circa 1654. The Metropolitan Museum of Art.
- Born: December 3, 1622; Toulouse, France
- Died: November 8, 1686 (aged 63); Caumont Castle
- Occupation: First president of the Parlement of Toulouse Procureur général of the Parlement of Toulouse
- Spouse: Marguerite de Gameville Gabrielle-Eléonore de Nogaret de La Valette
- Parents: Guillaume de Fieubet (father); Marguerite de Saint-Pol (mother)

Gaspard de Fieubet (December 3, 1622, in Toulouse - November 8, 1686, Château de Caumont) was a French magistrate. He served as president of the Parlement of Toulouse from 1653 to 1686, hailing from a prominent family in the legal and financial spheres. The Fieubet family had two branches: one in Paris and one in Toulouse; Gaspard de Fieubet was a distinguished member of the Toulouse branch.

As the first president of the Parlement of Toulouse, a significant court of law appointed by the king, Fieubet played a role in Louis XIV's policies in the South of France, particularly in curbing the rights of Protestants. In Toulouse, he purchased the Hôtel d'Ulmo on Ninau Street, seeking to exert control over the municipality by appointing the capitouls himself.

Though sometimes thought to be sympathetic to the Jansenists, Fieubet was an influential figure in Toulouse's cultural life, endeavoring to promote sciences, arts, and cultural institutions. He was the dedicatee of books on law, medicine, history, and poetry. Fieubet protected the Academy of Lanternists and the Institute of Girls' Education. He initiated the Salle des Illustres at the Capitole de Toulouse and supported Emmanuel Maignan while opposing Pierre de Fermat.

== Family and marriages ==
Gaspard de Fieubet was the son of Guillaume de Fieubet, a magistrate in the Parlement of Toulouse and the first president of the Parlement of Provence, and his wife Marguerite de Saint-Pol, daughter of Jacques de Saint-Pol, a master of requests.

He was the eldest son and had a younger brother and sisters:

- Bernard de Fieubet, secretary of the commands of Queen Anne of Austria and superintendent of finances.
- Isabelle, who died on September 12, 1671, married:
  - in 1646, Jean d'Olive, lord of Mesnil, counselor at the Parlement of Toulouse,
  - on February 7, 1654, Jean de Cassaigneau, lord of Saussans, counselor at the Parlement of Toulouse.
- Marguerite married Jean de Toureil in 1645, who served as attorney general of the Parlement of Toulouse from 1654 to 1669.

Gaspard de Fieubet was married twice: first, on March 3, 1648, to Marguerite de Gameville (who died on January 30, 1671), daughter of Philippe de Gameville, lord of Montpapou, and Anne de Paulo. The couple had six daughters, and one son:

- Marie-Marguerite de Fieubet, married to Jean-Guy de Maniban, a magistrate in the Parlement of Toulouse. Their son, Joseph-Gaspard de Maniban, became the first president of the Parlement of Toulouse.
- Gabrielle de Fieubet, married to M. de Mauriac, counselor at the Parlement of Toulouse.
- Marguerite de Fieubet, married to François, Marquis of Ossun.
- Jeanne de Fieubet, married on August 7, 1678, to Octavin de Cassaigneau de Saint-Félix (1650-1740).
- Catherine de Fieubet, married on September 14, 1690, to Pierre-Paul de Lombrail, lord of Rochemontès and Dauz, counselor at the Parlement of Toulouse.
- Paule-Thérèse de Fieubet, born on May 23, 1669, became a nun at the Visitation.
- Gaspard de Fieubet, counselor at the Parlement of Toulouse, dean of requests in 1709, died in 1711 without offspring, marking the end of this branch of the Fieubet family. He was a member of the Academy of Jeux Floraux.

On March 5, 1680, Fieubet married Gabrielle-Éléonore de Nogaret de La Valette (d. December 2, 1708), daughter of Jean de Nogaret de La Valette, general of the Venetian troops, and Gabrielle d'Aimar. Gabrielle-Éléonore de Nogaret owned the Château de Caumont. This second marriage was childless.

=== Parisian network ===
Gaspard de Fieubet was connected to both the Toulouse and Parisian circles. He belonged to the Toulouse branch of the Fieubet family, while the other branch settled in Paris. He was thus the first cousin of Gaspard III de Fieubet's father, who served the royal family.

In the 17th century, the Fieubets of Paris had direct ties to the gabelle farm milieu. These family groups served both the state and were financiers of the monarchy, which constantly required funds. From the second half of the 17th century, the Fieubets also became part of a dense network of allied families holding positions in the Parlement of Paris.

== Royal Authority Relay in Toulouse ==
At the Parlement of Toulouse, Gaspard de Fieubet was appointed as president of requests in November 1643, attorney general on April 26, 1645, and first president on June 21, 1653. He was appointed to this position by the king. During Fieubet's tenure as the first president, the Parlement of Toulouse was a significant court, consisting of over a hundred officers, including a dozen presidents and about a hundred counselors. This high number was due to the monarchy creating many lucrative offices within the framework of the sale of offices system. Consequently, the Parlement held considerable weight in the city: the Parlementarians, their families, and their servants accounted for approximately 4,000 people, representing over 13% of the intra-mural population.

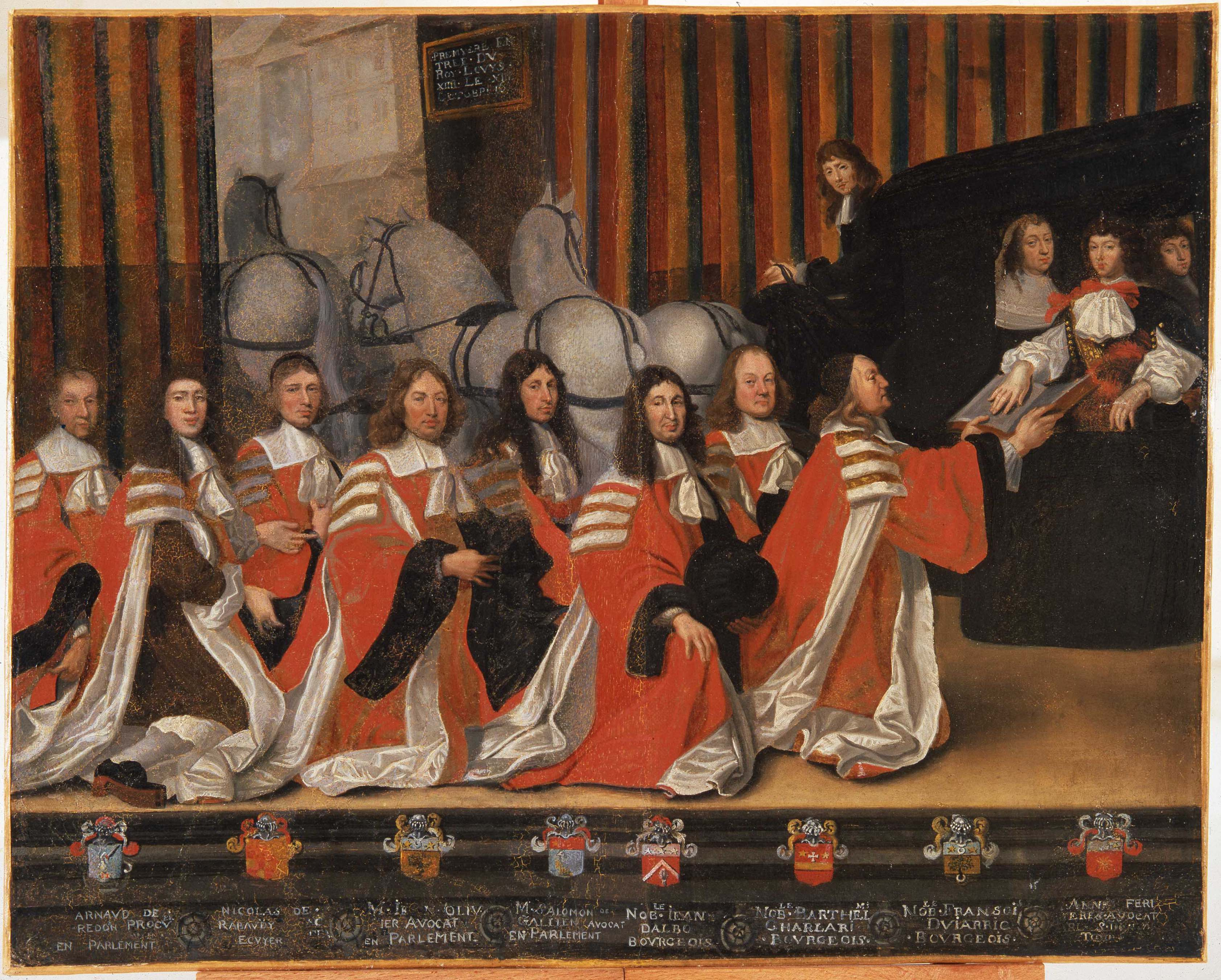
1659. Louis XIV swears on the Gospels to respect the municipal liberties of Toulouse before the kneeling capitouls. Painting by Antoine Durand (circa 1662). Municipal Archives of Toulouse.

As early as 1654, through two rulings, Gaspard de Fieubet contested the jurisdiction of the Parlement of Paris, which had sentenced François-Jacques d'Amboise d'Aubijoux to death in absentia for participating in a forbidden duel where his lieutenant was killed. Aubijoux was completely pardoned in 1656. Serving as the first president of the Parlement of Toulouse for over thirty years, Fieubet enforced royal authority in Languedoc and, if necessary, tempered his Parlement's tendencies towards independence. From the king's perspective, he was a reliable man.

Long before Fieubet's tenure, the Parlementarians sought to control the capitouls. Fieubet continued this trend by placing his agents within the municipality of Toulouse, such as Germain de Lafaille, whom he appointed as syndic. In 1659, Fieubet had the king approve the appointment of several of his friends as capitouls. By 1661, he was directly appointing them himself, thus reducing the city's autonomy. President Fieubet ensured that individuals "zealous for the king's service" were appointed to various positions, as he himself stated. In 1659, he had the opportunity to receive Louis XIV in person on behalf of the Parlement during the royal visit to Toulouse. The king expressed regret upon learning of his death.

=== Religious intolerance ===
While Fieubet served as the first president of the Parlement of Toulouse, his brother-in-law, Jean de Tourreil, was the attorney general. Together, they were the king's men, implementing his policies, particularly his anti-Protestant policies, even before the revocation of the Edict of Nantes. For instance, during the winter of 1666-1667, Fieubet presided over the "Grand Days" of Nîmes, during which numerous measures against Protestants were decided. These measures included silencing the Protestant communities by prohibiting the use of bells, despite being allowed by the Edict of Nantes. Fieubet justified these prohibitions by citing abuses committed by Protestants and the exclusive right of Catholics to ring bells during processions, aiming to reduce the public visibility of Protestants.

In 1679, following a royal edict, the Chamber of the Edict of Castres (a judicial chamber composed of both Catholics and Protestants) was abolished, and its magistrates were integrated into the Parlement of Toulouse. Among them, the Protestants were subsequently required, in accordance with the revocation of the Edict of Nantes in 1685, to relinquish their positions or abjure. As early as 1660, the Parlement of Toulouse, through a memorandum sent to the king and signed by Gaspard de Fieubet as the first president, had requested the merging of this chamber into the Parlement of Toulouse.

In 1685, two rulings from the Parlement of Toulouse condemned a group of Portuguese merchants, accused of Judaizing, to be burned alive in public. However, they were actually burned in effigy, with the aim of confiscating their assets for the royal treasury.

== Wealth ==
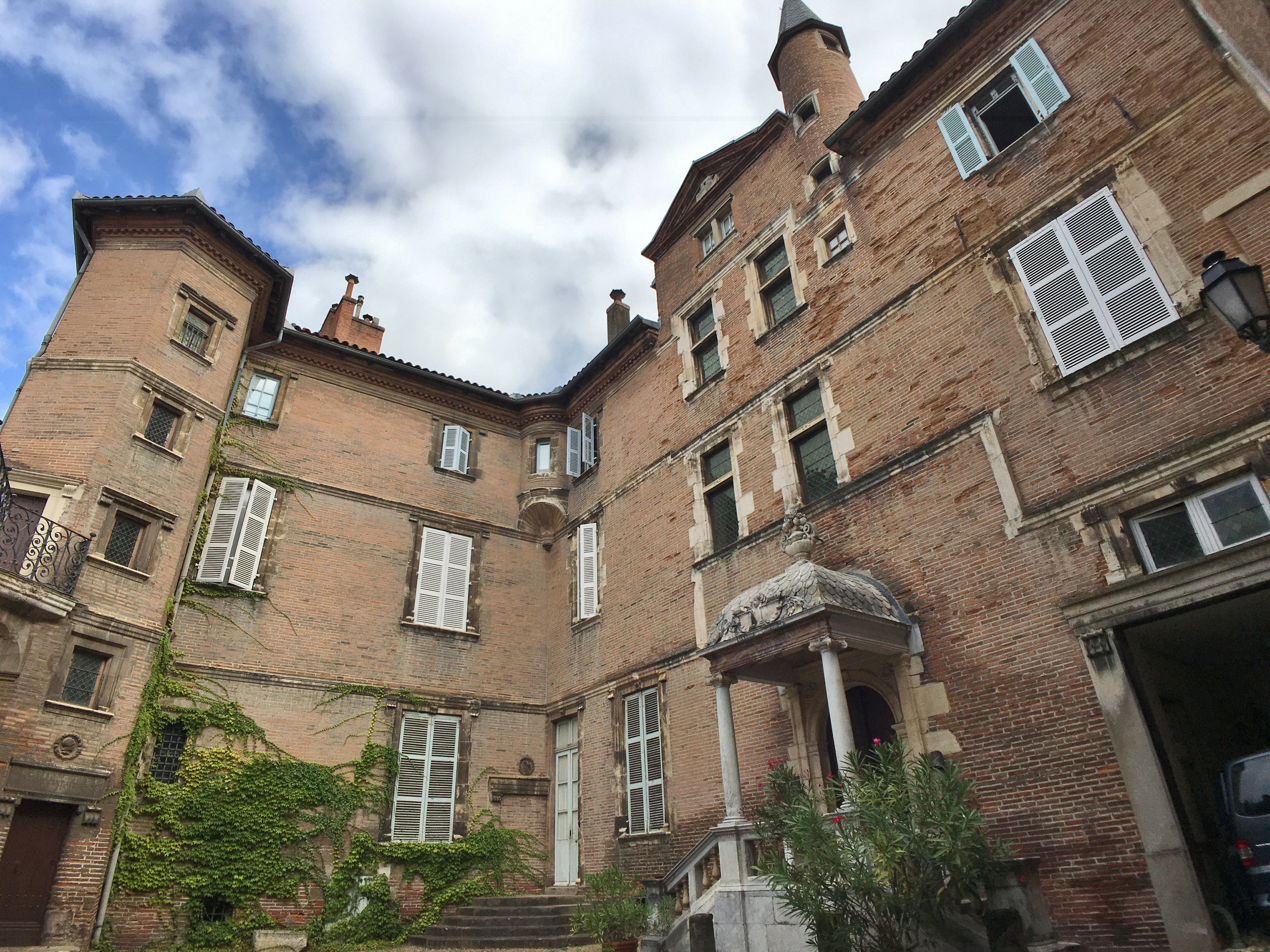
Hôtel d'Ulmo, residence of Gaspard de Fieubet, Ninau Street in Toulouse.

The first president of the Parlement of Toulouse received an annual salary of just over 800 livres (not always paid regularly), 3,000 livres in royal pension, and spices, the value of which did not exceed 2,500 livres. These revenues were significant but did not cover the expenses necessary to maintain his status. In fact, if Toulouse Parlementarians were wealthy, it was out of necessity to purchase their position and maintain their rank, not because their office was lucrative. Presidents of the Parlement were on average twice as wealthy as counselors because their office was much more valuable.

Around 1653, Gaspard de Fieubet purchased the Hôtel d'Ulmo, built a century earlier on Ninau Street, where the prominent Parlementary families of Toulouse resided. Upon his death, this mansion passed to his daughter Catherine de Fieubet and her husband, Pierre-Paul de Lombrail.

== Law, sciences, and literature ==
It was logical for Toulouse legal scholars to dedicate their collections to Gaspard de Fieubet, the first president of the Parlement. Notable examples include "Abrégé du Recueil des arrests notables de la Cour de Parlement de Tolose" by Géraud de Maynard (1666), "Clarissimi viri Guilielmi Marani antecessoris Tolosani civilium operum" by Bernard Médon (1677), and "Questions notables du droit, décidées par divers arrests de la Cour de parlement de Toulouse" by Simon d'Olive du Mesnil (1682). Fieubet was also the dedicatee of other legal works such as "Eclaircissement nouveau, sur le prêt et les intérêts" by Bernard du Puy (1687).

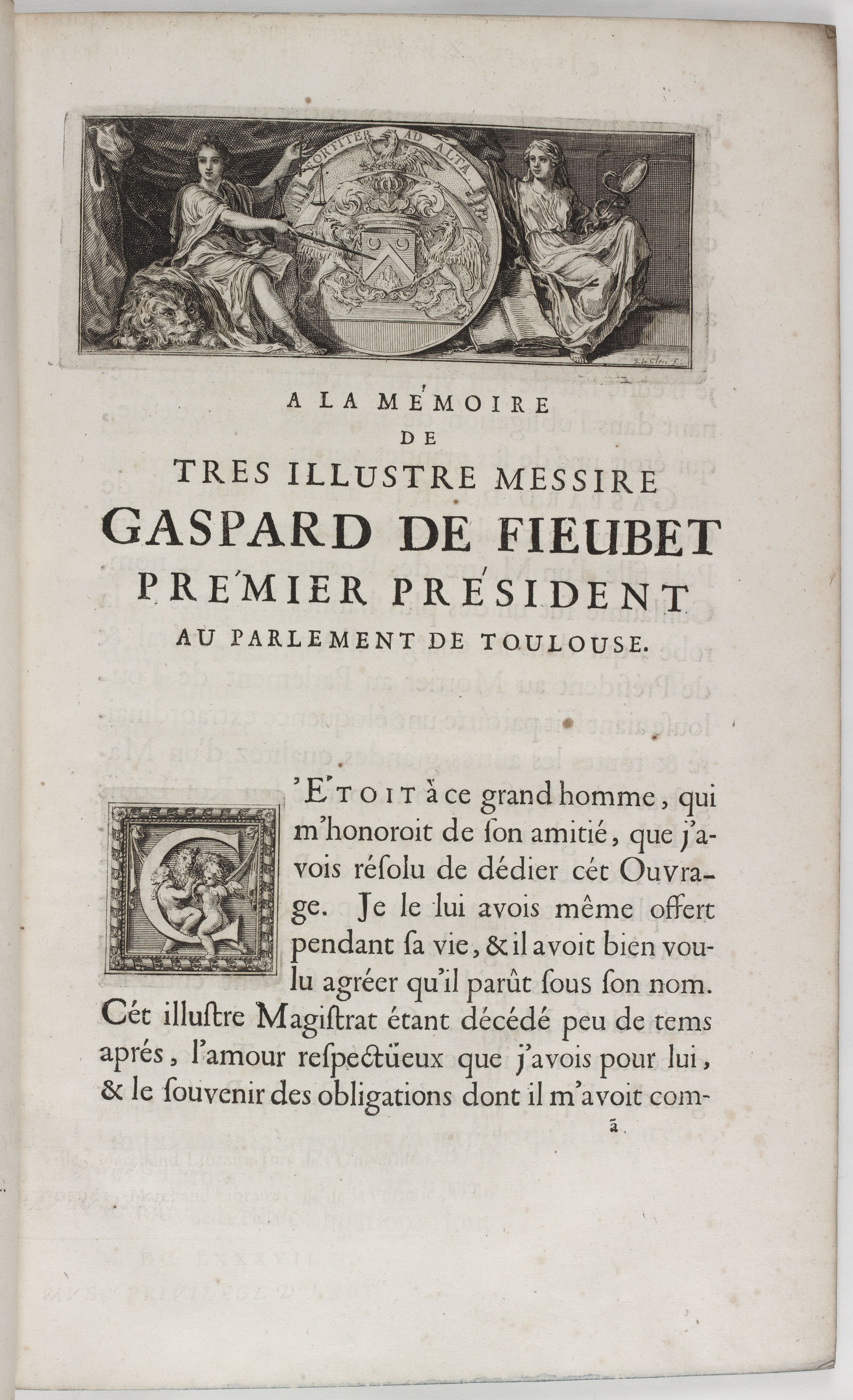
Dedication page of "Annales de la ville de Toulouse" by Germain de Lafaille (1687), BNF (Bibliothèque nationale de France).

From the late 16th century onwards, Toulouse Parlementarians began to dominate the municipality (the capitouls) in controlling Toulouse's cultural life. The first president of the Parlement, Gaspard de Fieubet, followed this model and, like his Parisian cousin Gaspard III de Fieubet, surrounded himself with men of letters, organizing religious and scientific debates often led by theologian and physicist Emmanuel Maignan, whom he protected. It was Maignan who introduced Fieubet to astronomy and the use of the microscope.

Books dedicated to Fieubet on topics other than law include philosophical reflections such as "Cursus philosophicus, in quo totius scholae quaestiones" by the Christian doctrine priest Jean Vincent (1658), as well as medical treatises such as "Tractatus de vulneribus capitis" by Louis de Queyrats (1657) or "Doctrine nouvelle de la poudre vitriolique de sympathie" by Mathias Hyar (1677).

Fieubet supported the Toulouse historian Germain de Lafaille, who dedicated his "Annales de la ville de Toulouse" to his memory, published just after Fieubet's death in 1687, devoting the first fifteen pages to praising the Fieubet family.

Fieubet was also the initiator of the Salle des Illustres at the Capitole de Toulouse. Due to serious disputes with the mathematician Pierre de Fermat, the representation of the latter was absent from this gallery for a long time. This enmity between Fermat and Fieubet was also confirmed by the province's intendant, Claude Bazin de Bezons. It stemmed from a different interpretation of a legal case. In January 1658, a priest named Jean Montralon, with Jansenist leanings, was sentenced and hanged at Fieubet's instigation. This decision angered Fermat, who, as a counselor at the Parlement of Toulouse, was the rapporteur and examining judge in this case. His investigation had convinced him of Montralon's innocence.

== Promotion of cultural institutions ==
In 1680, Fieubet arranged for the city to provide an apartment, located in a house near Pont-Neuf Square, for the budding Toulouse academy, called the Academy of Lanternists, to hold meetings there, led by Abbé Maury. Thus, the Academy of Lanternists, which had disappeared a few years prior, was restored under his patronage. However, it struggled to survive because scholars were drawn to the capital. Gaspard de Fieubet was also the dedicatee of poetry works, such as "Le Triomphe de l'églantine aux Jeux Fleureaux," published by Jacques-Charles de Ranchin de Montredon (1683) after winning the Églantine prize at the Jeux Floraux competition.

The Fieubet mansion on Rue Ninau was sometimes described as a center of Jansenism. In a ruling from the Parlement of Toulouse that he himself signed in 1663, Gaspard de Fieubet protected the Institute of the Daughters of Childhood, founded in 1662 in Toulouse by Madame de Mondonville and Abbé de Ciron, who were linked to the Toulouse Parlementary milieu. The young girls entering this congregation came from Parlementary families. This institute, reputed to be close to Jansenism, was dismantled by order of Louis XIV in 1686, and Gaspard de Fieubet's nephew, Abbé Jean de Tourreil, failed to defend its cause in Rome.

As Fieubet suffered from gout, in 1657 he obtained from the Archbishop of Toulouse, Pierre de Marca, the latter's own cushion to kneel on in the cathedral choir, a position that caused him pain. This practice was contested forty years later in the Council of State. This ailment plagued him for much of his life, as over twenty years later, in March 1681, he complained in a letter of "the gout which has afflicted me for a month".

After drafting his will on February 13, 1686, he died on November 8, 1686, at the Château de Caumont.

== Heraldry ==
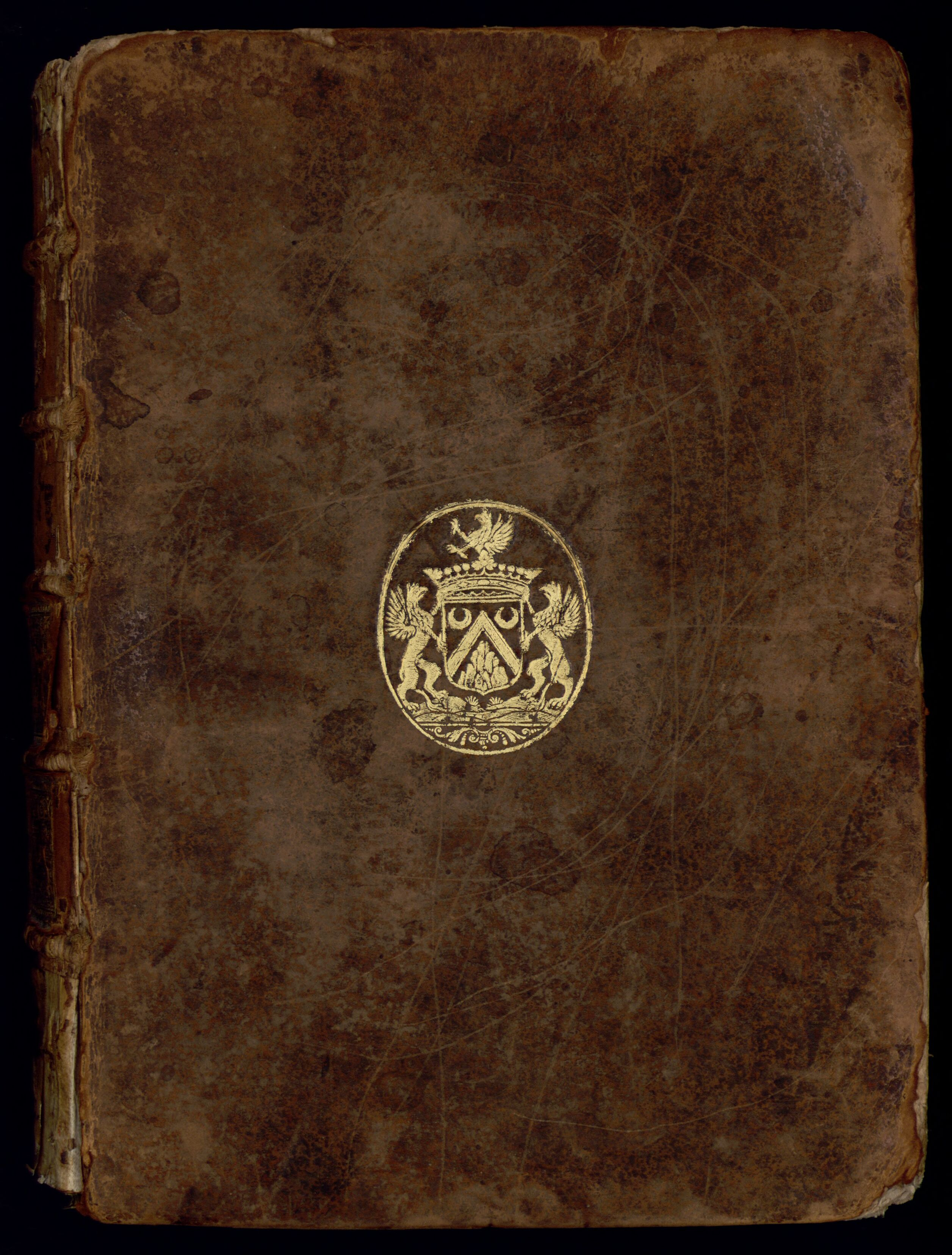
Arms of Gaspard Fieubet de Launac (1626-1694)

During the modern era, there were numerous coats of arms of this type. The gold chevron on a field of azure was the most commonly used honorable piece because it represented the idea of elevation. It was often accompanied by a lower object.

== See also ==
- Parlement of Toulouse
- Emmanuel Maignan
- Pierre de Fermat
