= Fermat's theorem =

The works of the 17th-century mathematician Pierre de Fermat engendered many theorems. Fermat's theorem may refer to one of the following theorems:

- Fermat's Last Theorem, about integer solutions to a^{n} + b^{n} = c^{n}
- Fermat's little theorem, a property of prime numbers
- Fermat's theorem on sums of two squares, about primes expressible as a sum of squares
- Fermat's theorem (stationary points), about local maxima and minima of differentiable functions
- Fermat's principle, about the path taken by a ray of light
- Fermat polygonal number theorem, about expressing integers as a sum of polygonal numbers
- Fermat's right triangle theorem, about squares not being expressible as the difference of two fourth powers

== See also ==
- List of things named after Pierre de Fermat
