= Maignan =

Maignan is a French surname. Notable people with the surname include:

- Albert Maignan (1845–1908), French painter and illustrator
- Emmanuel Maignan (1601–1676), French physicist and Catholic theologian
- Gilles Maignan (born 1968), French cyclist
- Mike Maignan (born 1995), French association football player

== See also ==
- Maignan Point in Antarctica
