= Pierre de Carcavi =

French mathematician and librarian

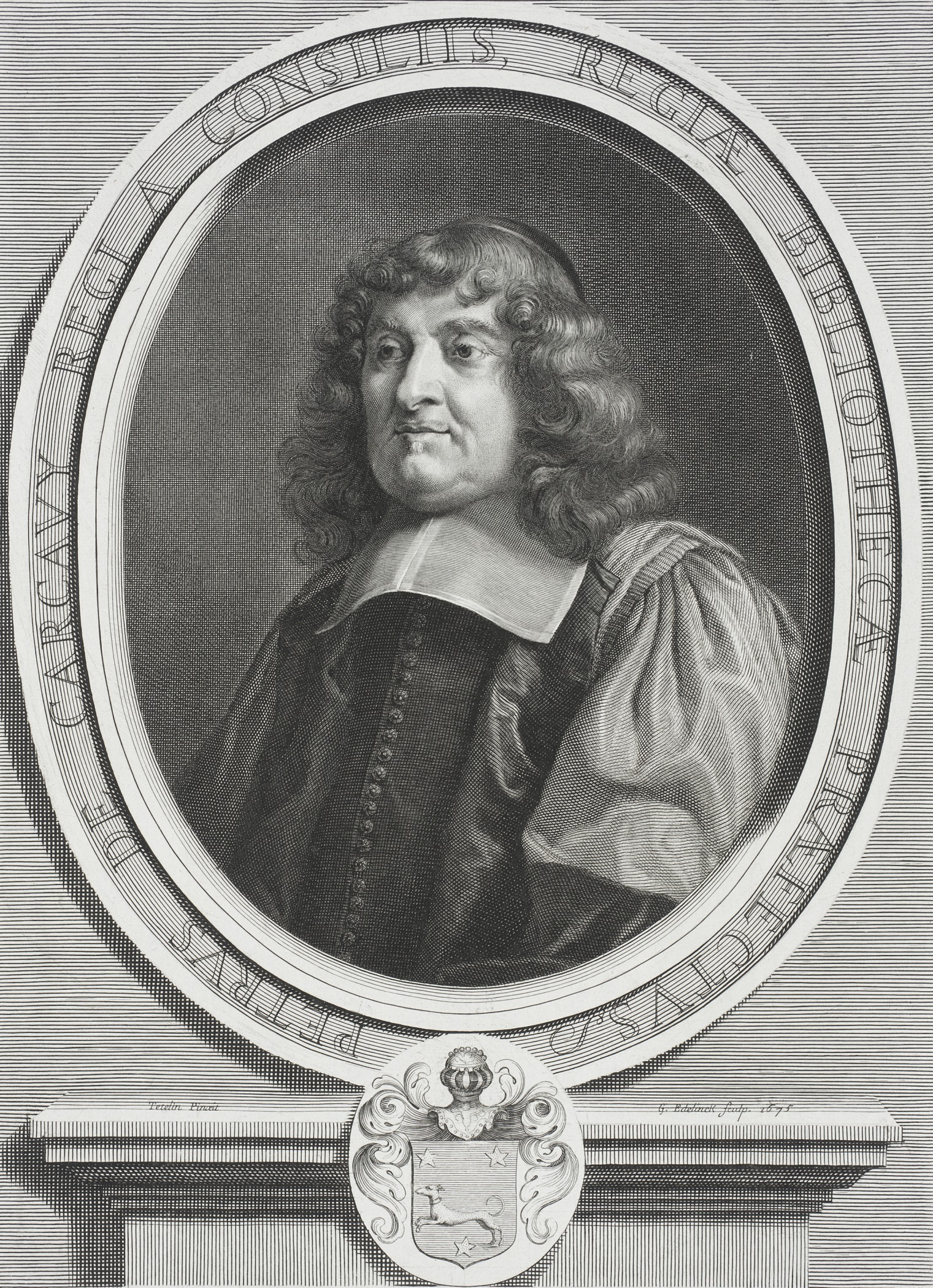
Engraving of Pierre de Carcavy's portrait, a Gift of Mr. and Mrs. Theodore Harris

Pierre de Carcavi was born in about 1603, in Lyon, France and died in Paris in April 1684. He was a secretary of the National Library of France under Louis XIV. Carcavi was a French mathematician.

Carcavi is known for his correspondence with Pierre de Fermat, Blaise Pascal, Christiaan Huygens, Galileo Galilei, Marin Mersenne, Evangelista Torricelli and René Descartes.
