= Étienne d'Espagnet =

Étienne d'Espagnet (born c. 1596) was the son of parliamentary counselor Jean d'Espagnet and Charlotte De Mangeau. He became a parliamentary counselor in 1617. He married in 1629 and had a son in 1634.

He was friends with Viète and Fermat. d'Espagnet shared mathematical interest with Fermat and was the recipient of at least some of Fermat's mathematical papers.
