= Jean d'Espagnet =

Jean d'Espagnet (1564 – c. 1637) was a French Renaissance polymath. He was a lawyer, politician, mathematician, alchemist, antiquarian, poet, and friend of French literati.

D'Espagnet was a counsellor in the Parlement of Bordeaux and its president from 1600 to 1611. In this position, he was involved, with Pierre de Lancre, in witch-hunting in Labourd. D'Espagnet cochaired de Lancre's 1609 repression, also congratulating his colleague on his job in the introduction to L'Incrédulité et mécréance du sortilège pleinement convaincues, besides condemning the Basque people, "this perverse people".

Jean d'Espagnet is known to have owned several books that had previously formed part of Michel de Montaigne's library, including his copy of De rerum natura, in which his signature overwrites that of Montaigne's on the title page. In 1623, d'Espagnet wrote Arcanum Hermeticae philosophiae and Enchiridion physicae restitutae.

His son, Étienne d'Espagnet, utilized his father's library and designed optics for astronomy.
