= Roland Lefebvre (painter) =

French painter

- Born: 1608; Anjou
- Died: 1677 (aged 68–69); Leicester Fields
- Occupation: Painter

Roland Lefebvre (1608 – 1677) was a French painter.

== Biography ==
Lefebvre was born at Anjou in 1608. He painted both history and portraits, and studied for many years in Italy. For a long time he resided at Venice, whence he is sometimes known as 'Lefebvre de Venise.' He was admitted a member of the Venetian Academy of Painting and Sculpture on 6 January 1663, but after quarrelling because he was only admitted as a portrait-painter and not as a history-painter, he was excluded from the Academy on 14 March 1665. Lefebvre thereupon came over to England. He obtained the patronage of Prince Rupert by revealing to him a new method of staining marble. He painted portraits and small history pictures, but was not much esteemed. He died in Bear Street, Leicester Fields, in 1677, and was buried in St. Martin's-in-the-Fields. A portrait of Lefebvre, in a fur cap, formerly in the possession of Philip Mercier the painter, was engraved for Horace Walpole's 'Anecdotes of Painting.' He must be carefully distinguished from Claude Lefèbvre, a well-known painter in Paris at the same time, who did not come to England, and also from Valentin Lefebre, who resided many years at Venice, where he engraved works of Titian, Paolo Veronese, and others.
