= Emmanuel Maignan =

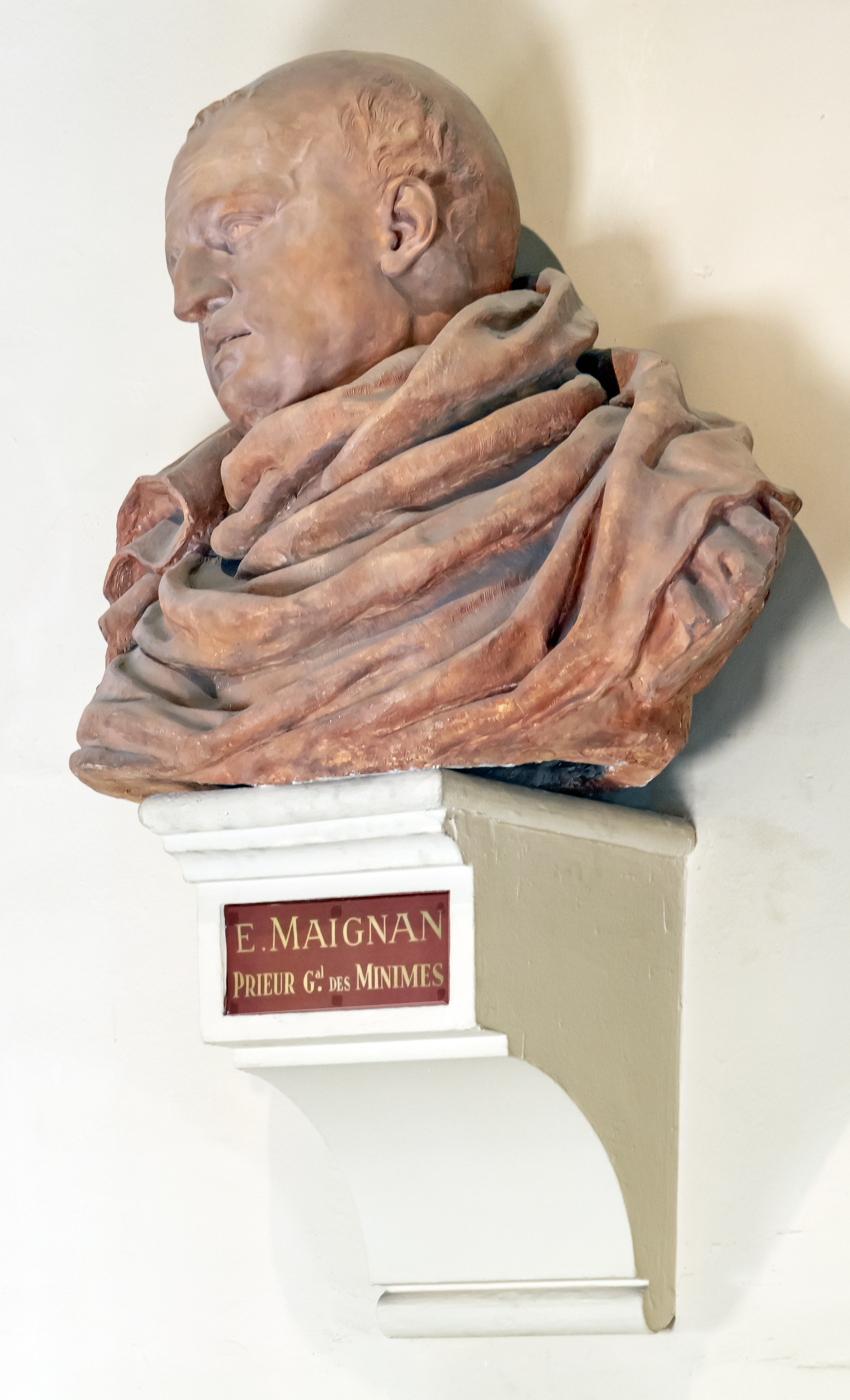
Emmanuel Maignan by Marc Arcis

Emmanuel Maignan (also Emanuel; Toulouse, 17 July 1601 – Toulouse, 29 October 1676) was a French physicist and Catholic Minimite theologian.

His writings were particularly influential in Spain, where they were resisted by his fellow Minim Francisco Palanco.

== Life ==
His father was dean of the Chancery of Toulouse, and his mother's father was professor of medicine at the University of Toulouse. He studied the humanities at the Jesuit college. At the age of eighteen he joined the Order of Minims. His instructor in philosophy was a follower of Aristotle, but Maignan soon began to dispute and oppose all that seemed to him false in Aristotle's teachings, especially of physics. He preferred Plato to Aristotle.

He mastered the mathematics of the day, practically without aid from anyone. At the end of a few years his ability was recognized by his superiors and he was given charge of the instruction of novices. In 1636 he was called to Rome by the general of the order to teach mathematics at the convent of the Trinità dei Monti. There he lived for fourteen years, engaged in mathematics and in physical experiments, and publishing his work on gnomonics and perspective.

In 1650 he returned to Toulouse and was made provincial. When his three years were up, he was glad to devote himself entirely to his studies. When Louis XIV, having seen his machines and curiosities at Toulouse, invited him to Paris, in 1669, through Cardinal Mazarin, he begged to be allowed to pass his life in the seclusion of the convent.

== Works ==
His published works are:

- "Perspectiva horaria sive de horographia gnomonica tum theoretica tum practica" (4 vols., Rome, 1648);
- "Cursus philosophicus" (1st ed., 4 vols., Toulouse, 1652; 2nd ed. with changes and additions, Lyons, 1673);
- "Sacra philosophia entis supernaturalis" (Lyons, 1662, 1st vol., and 1672, 2nd vol.);
- "Dissertatio theologica de usu licito pecuniæ" (Lyons, 1673).

This dissertation seemed to authorize usury and was therefore censured by a number of bishops and put on the Index Librorum Prohibitorum.

== See also ==
- List of Roman Catholic scientist-clerics
- Gaspard de Fieubet
