= Hôtel d'Ulmo =

Coordinates: 43.5976°N 1.4499°E

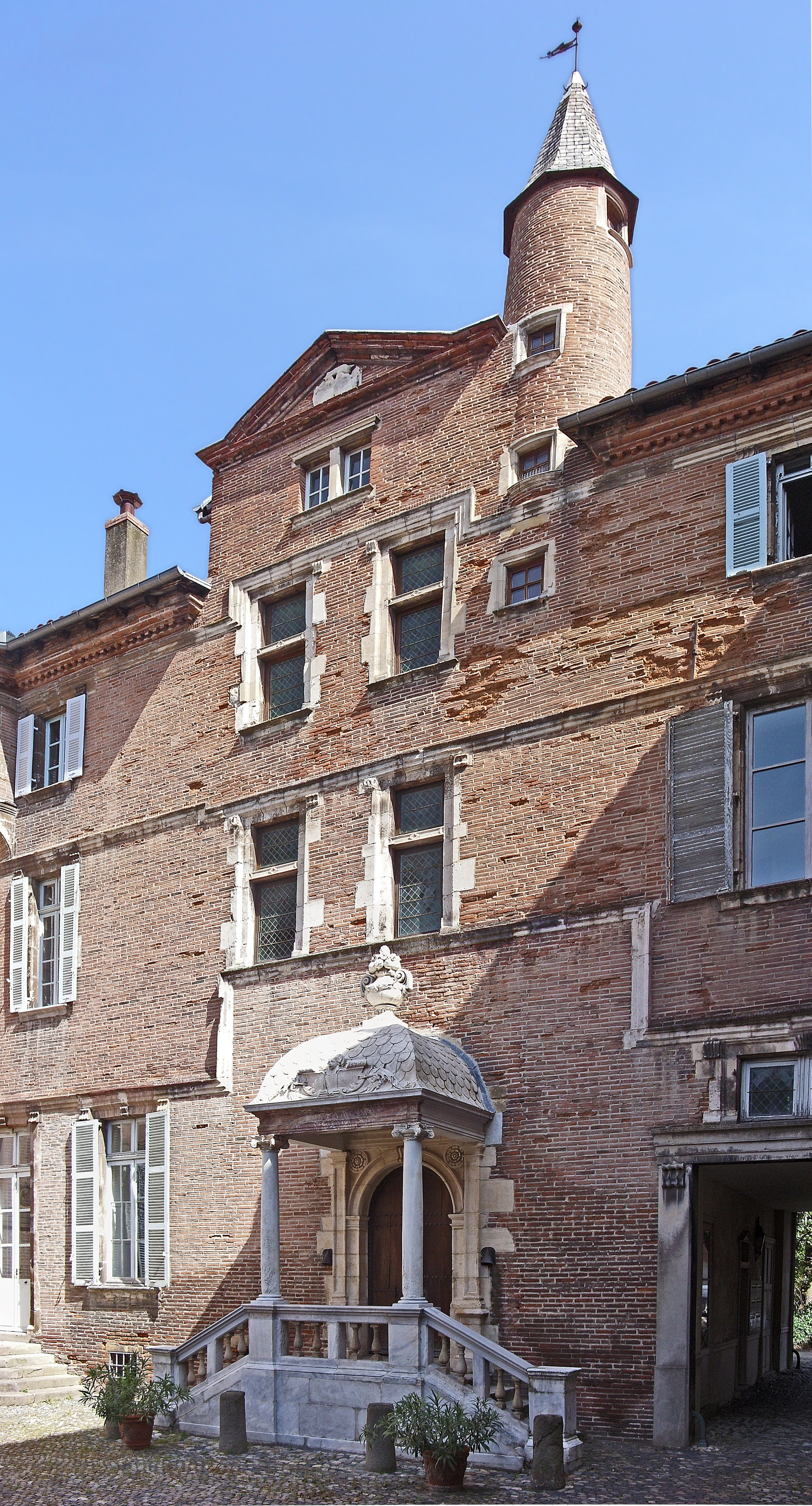

General information
- Architectural style: Renaissance
- Location: 15 Rue Ninau, 31000 Toulouse, France

The Hôtel d'Ulmo in Toulouse, France, is a Renaissance hôtel particulier (palace) of the 16th century. It is a listed historical monument since 1925.

== History ==
The Hotel d'Ulmo is located at 15 rue Ninau, in the historical center of Toulouse, and was built between 1526 and 1536 on an old and important building of the 16th century for the magistrate Jehan de Ulmo. Advocate General at the Parlement of Toulouse in 1526, mortar president in 1529. Recognized guilty of corruption he was in 1537 pilloried and imprisoned for life. His motto "Durum Patientia frango" engraved above the portal of the hexagonal tower, translates as: "My perseverance triumphs over everything."

== Description ==
Although there have been several building campaigns, the architectural ensemble is very homogeneous. It is also innovative: a central double staircase is substituted for the traditional spiral staircase included in a tower of the courtyard. The whole organization of the house, now thought around a median axis, is modified. This modern and probably pioneering distribution in Toulouse was somewhat disturbed by the opening of the access passage to the garden (18th or 19th century).

The porch pavilion, with its marble balusters and stone dome, is probably from the 17th century. It is possible, however, that a canopy of the sixteenth century which was then in the courtyard of the Parlement of Toulouse served as a model for this one.

== Gallery ==
Hôtel d'Ulmo

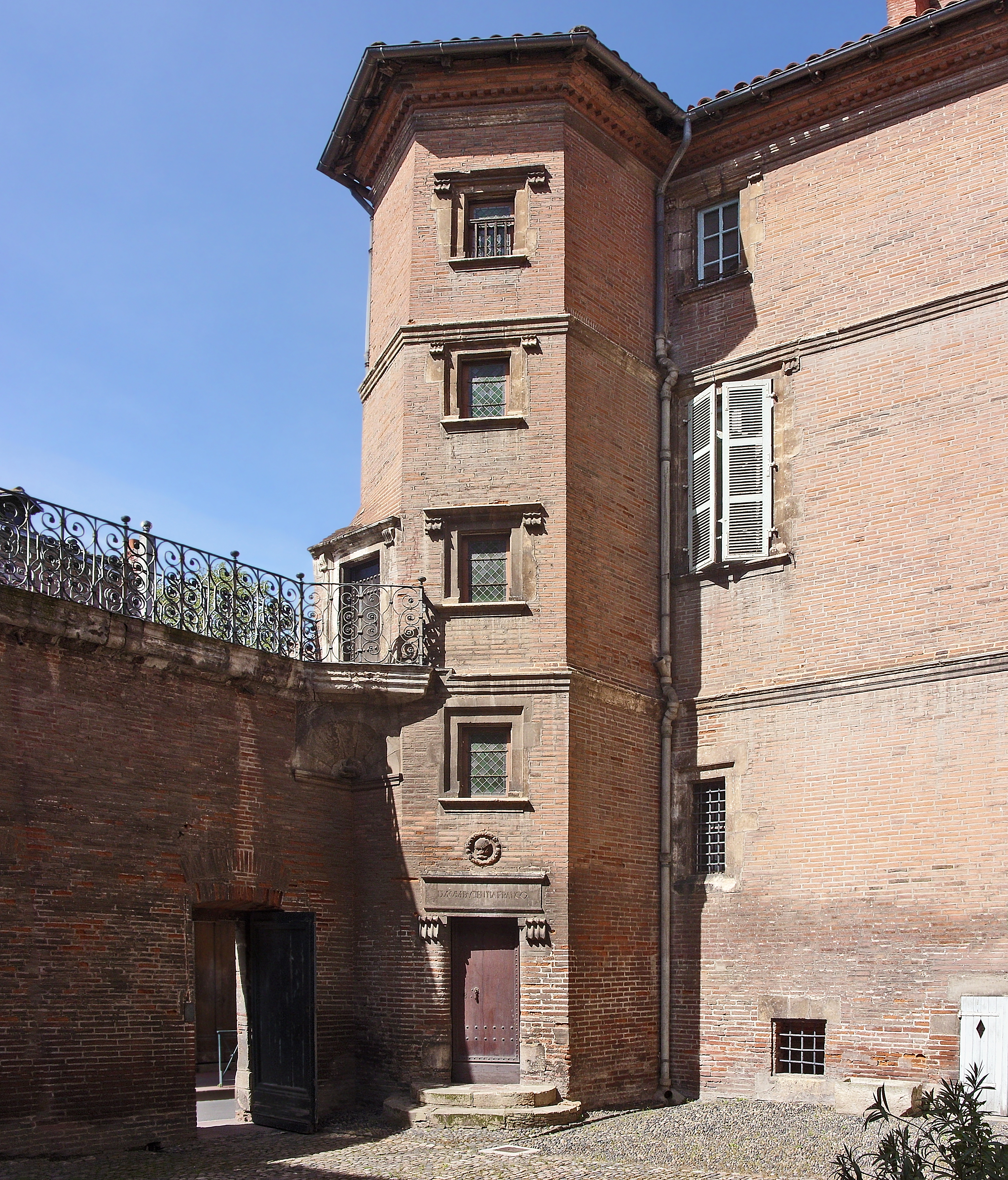
Hexagonal tower

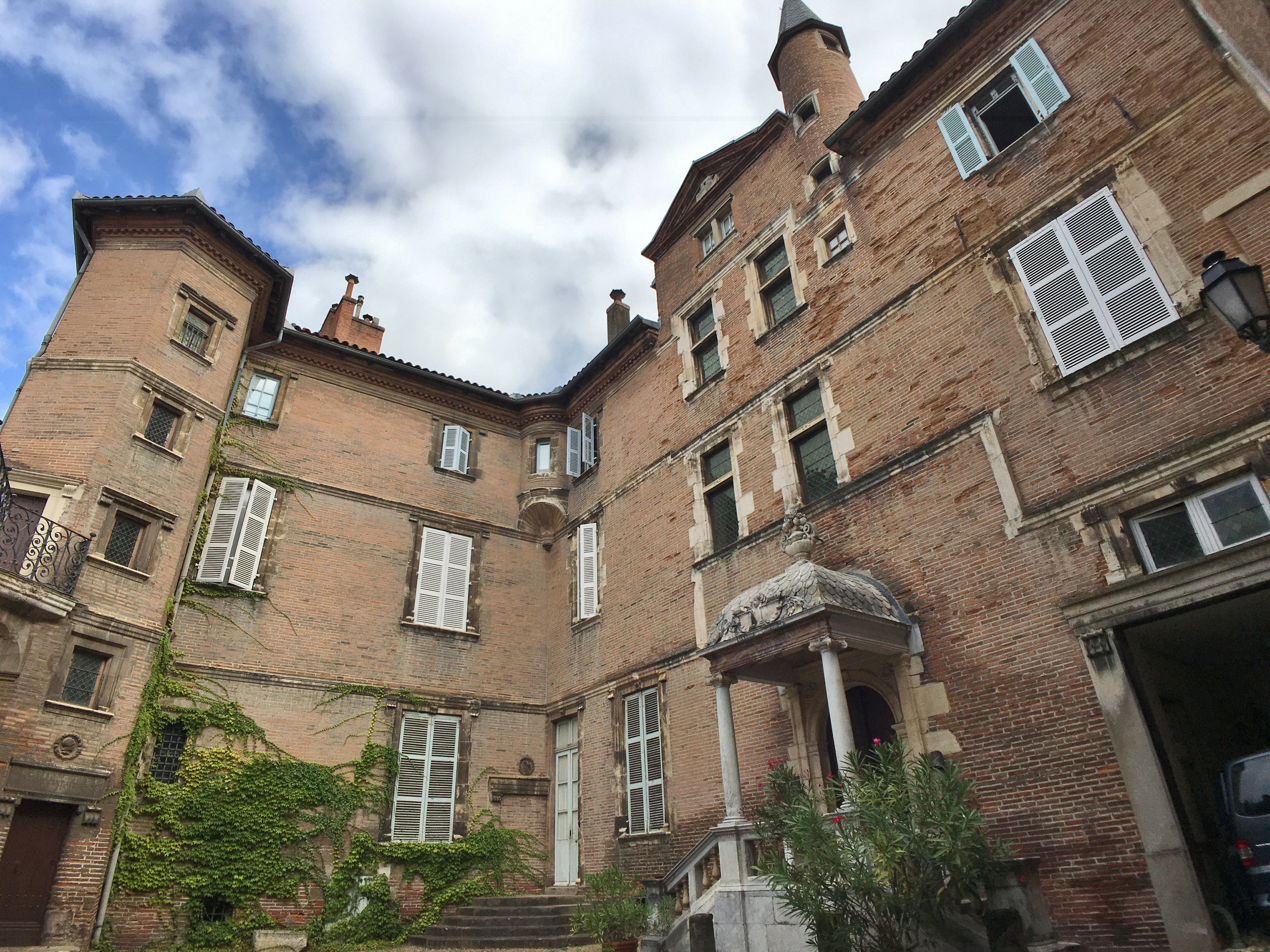
Buildings on the courtyard

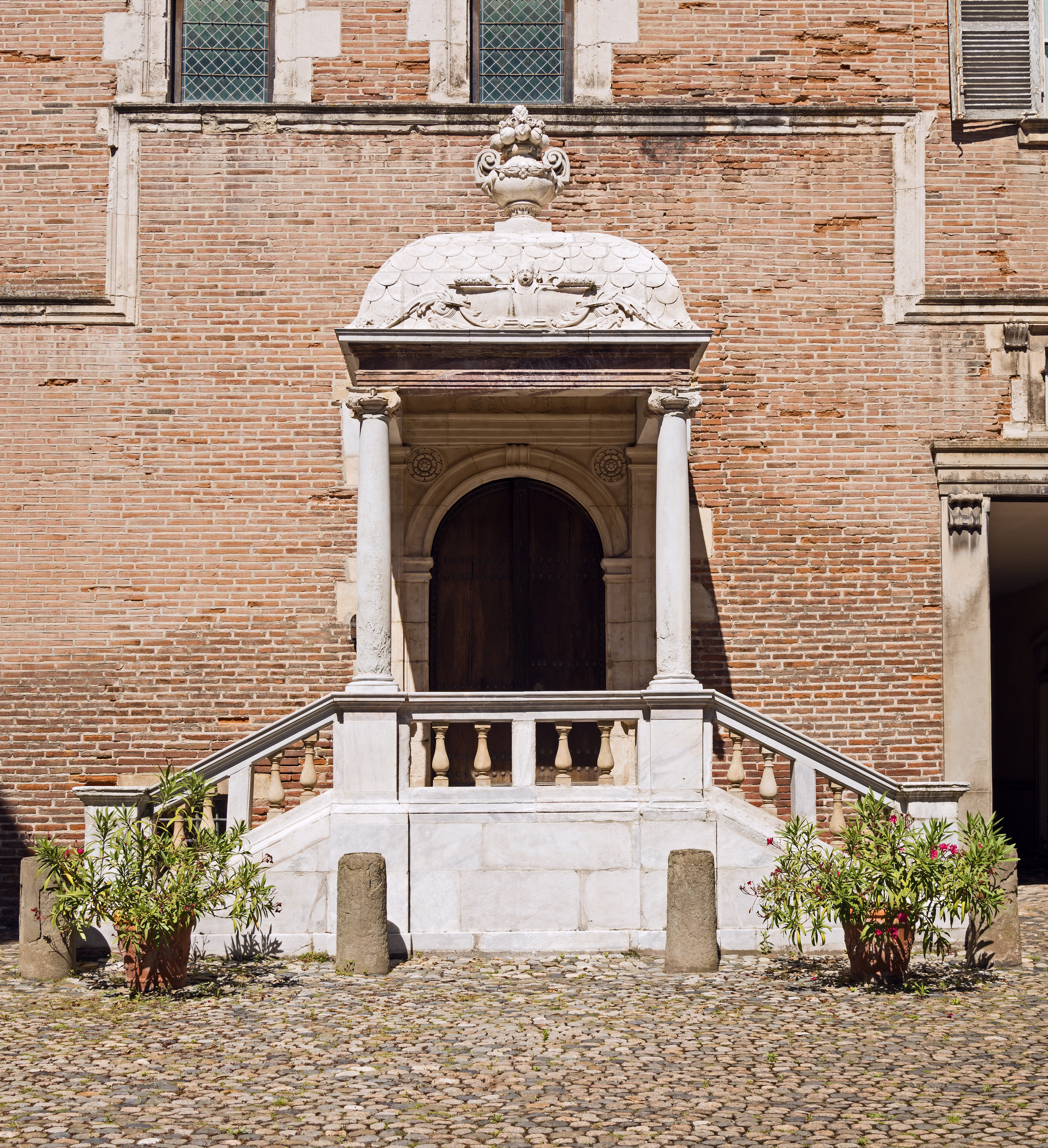
Canopy of the front door

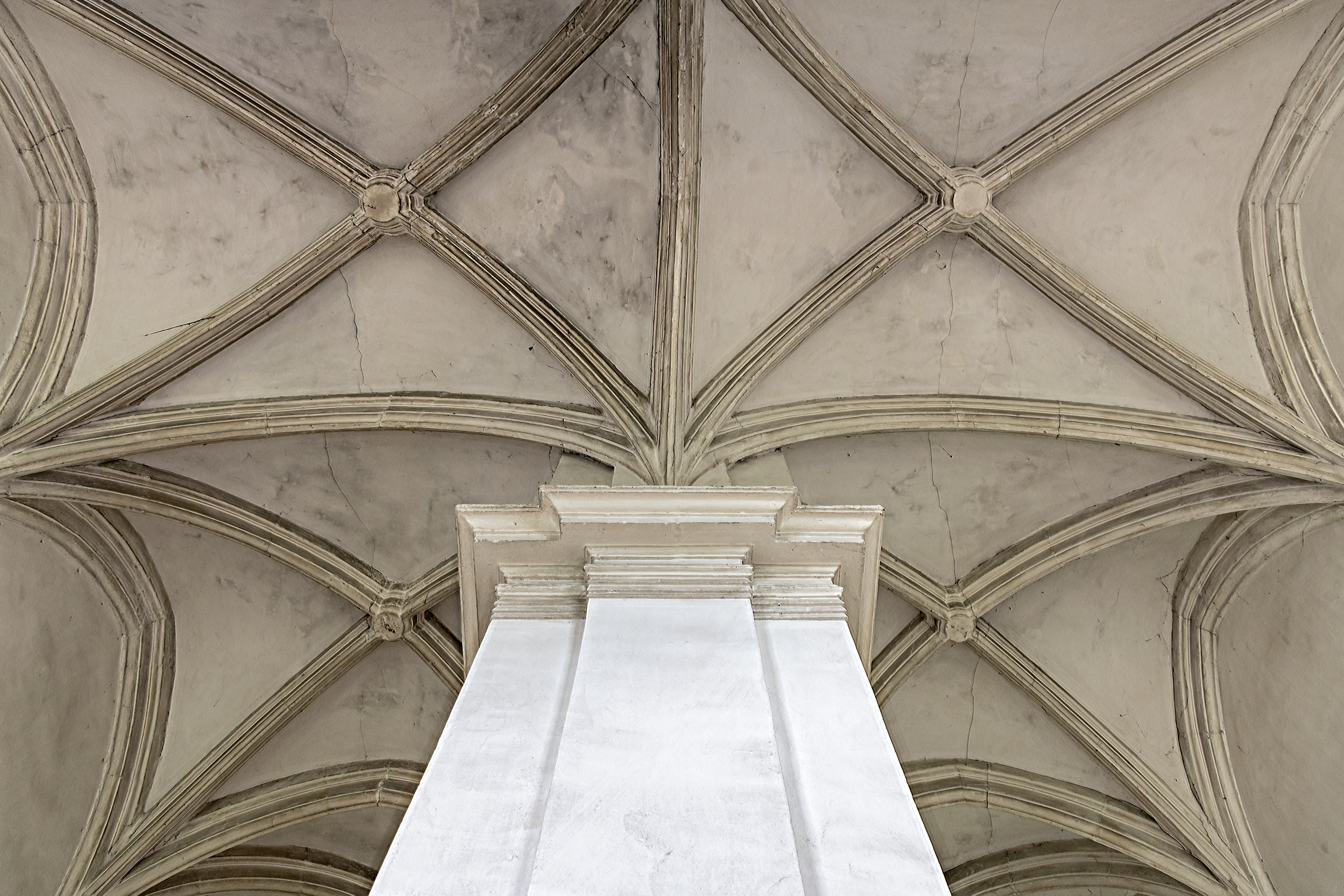
Ceiling of the main staircase in cross ogives.

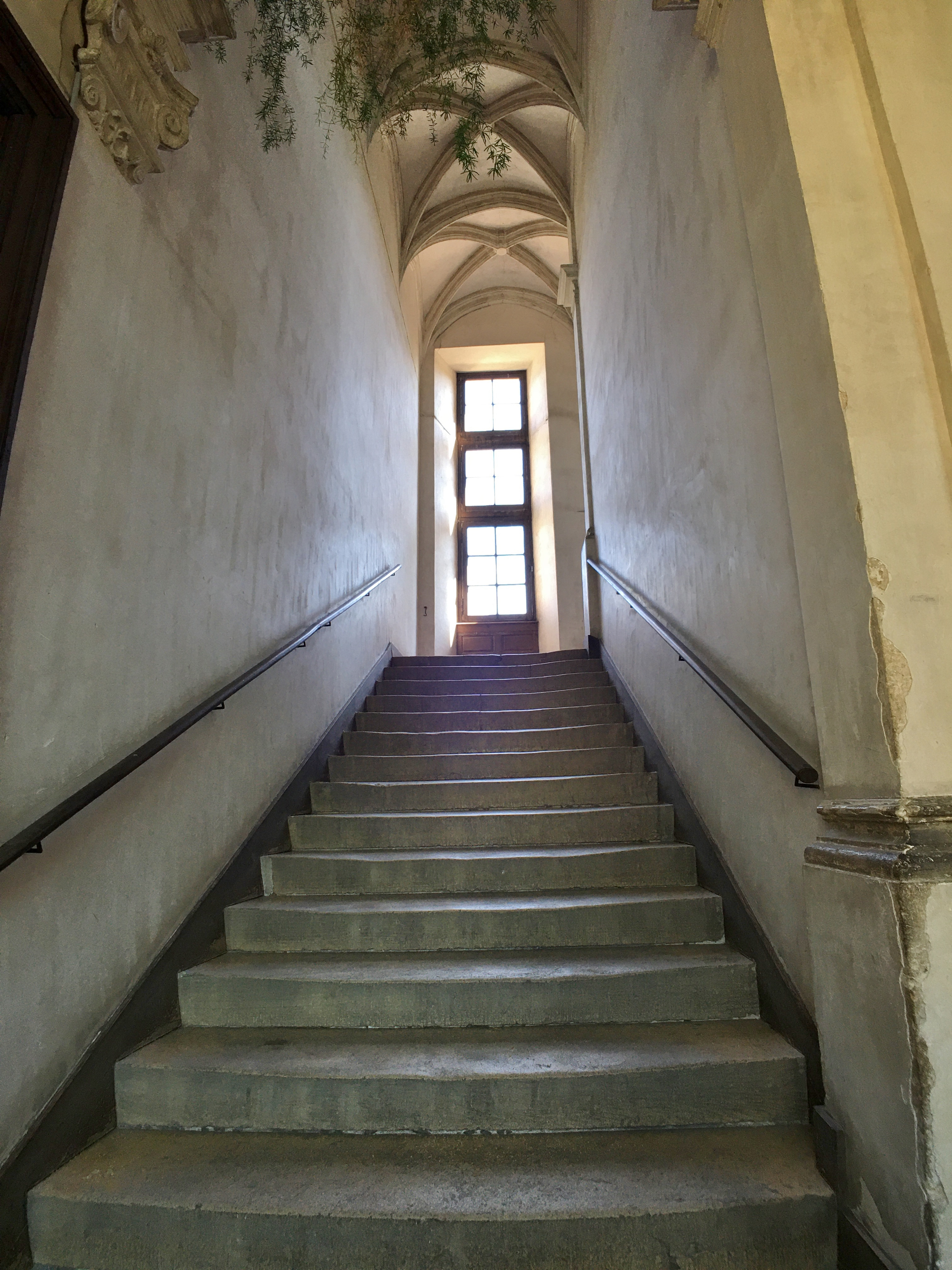
The staircase of the Ulmo hotel is the first straight staircase in Toulouse.

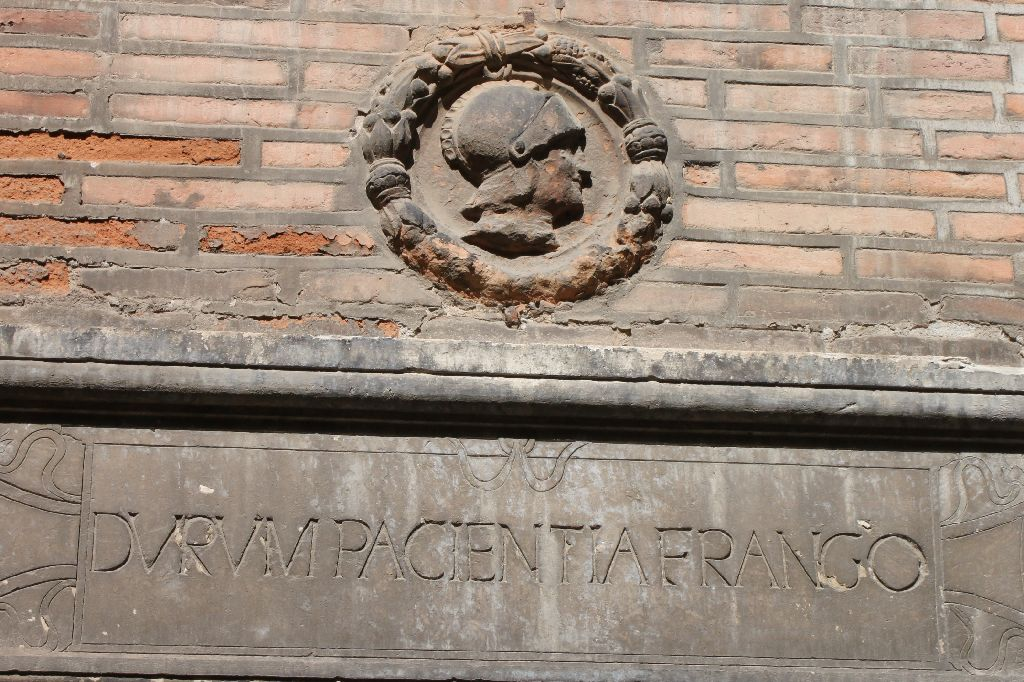
Motto

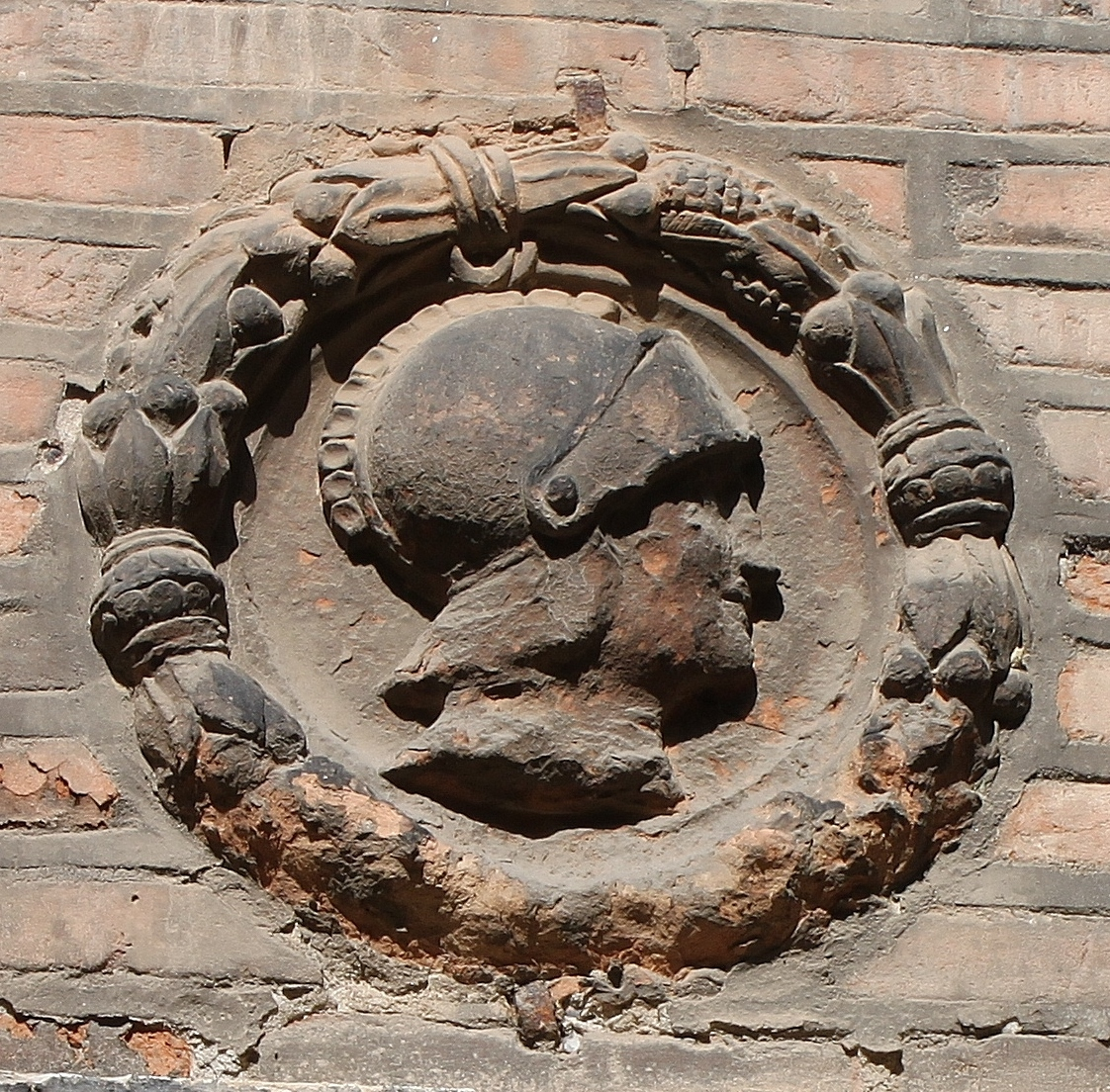
Medallion of Jean d'Ulmo

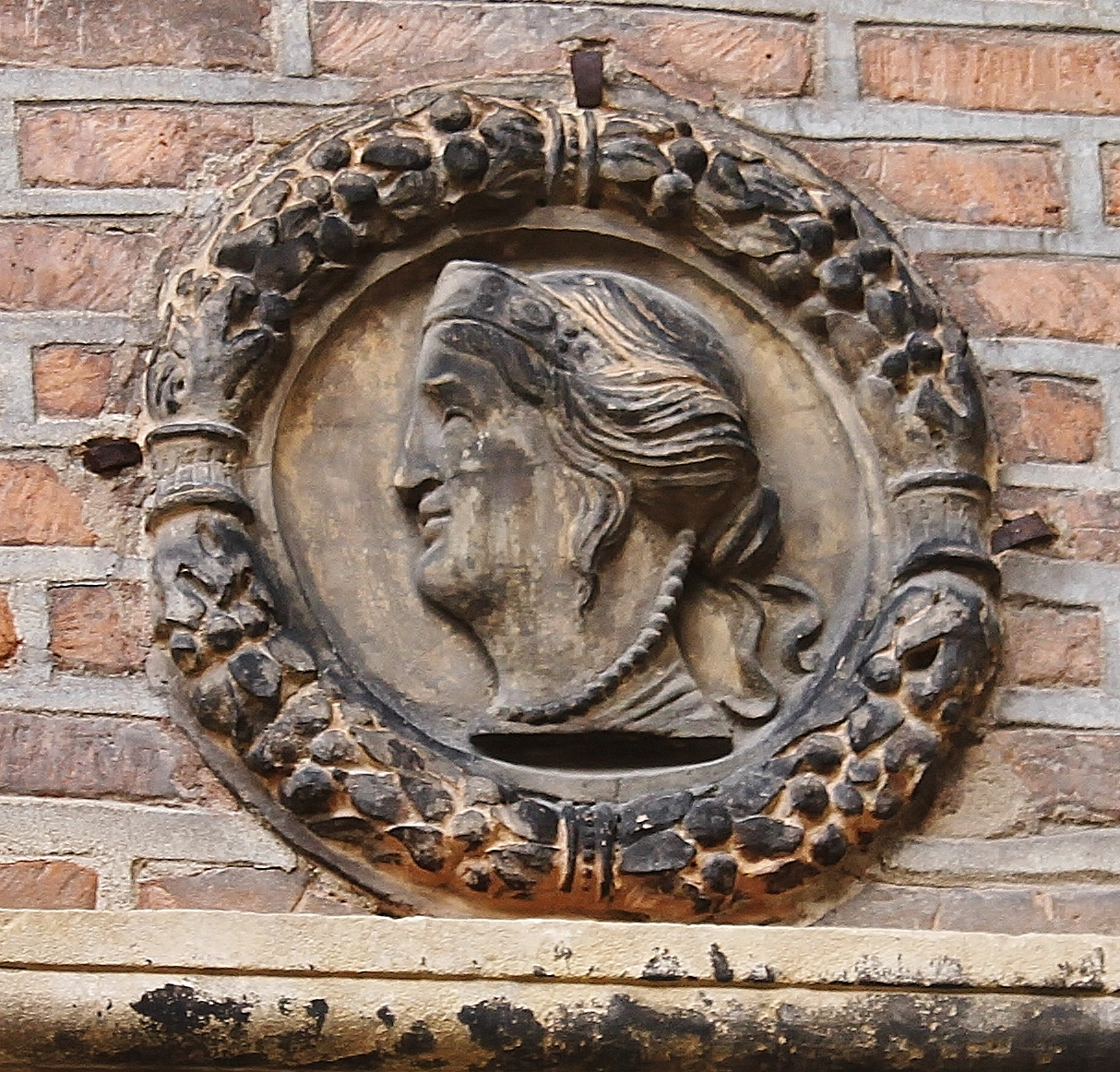
Medallion of Ulmo's wife

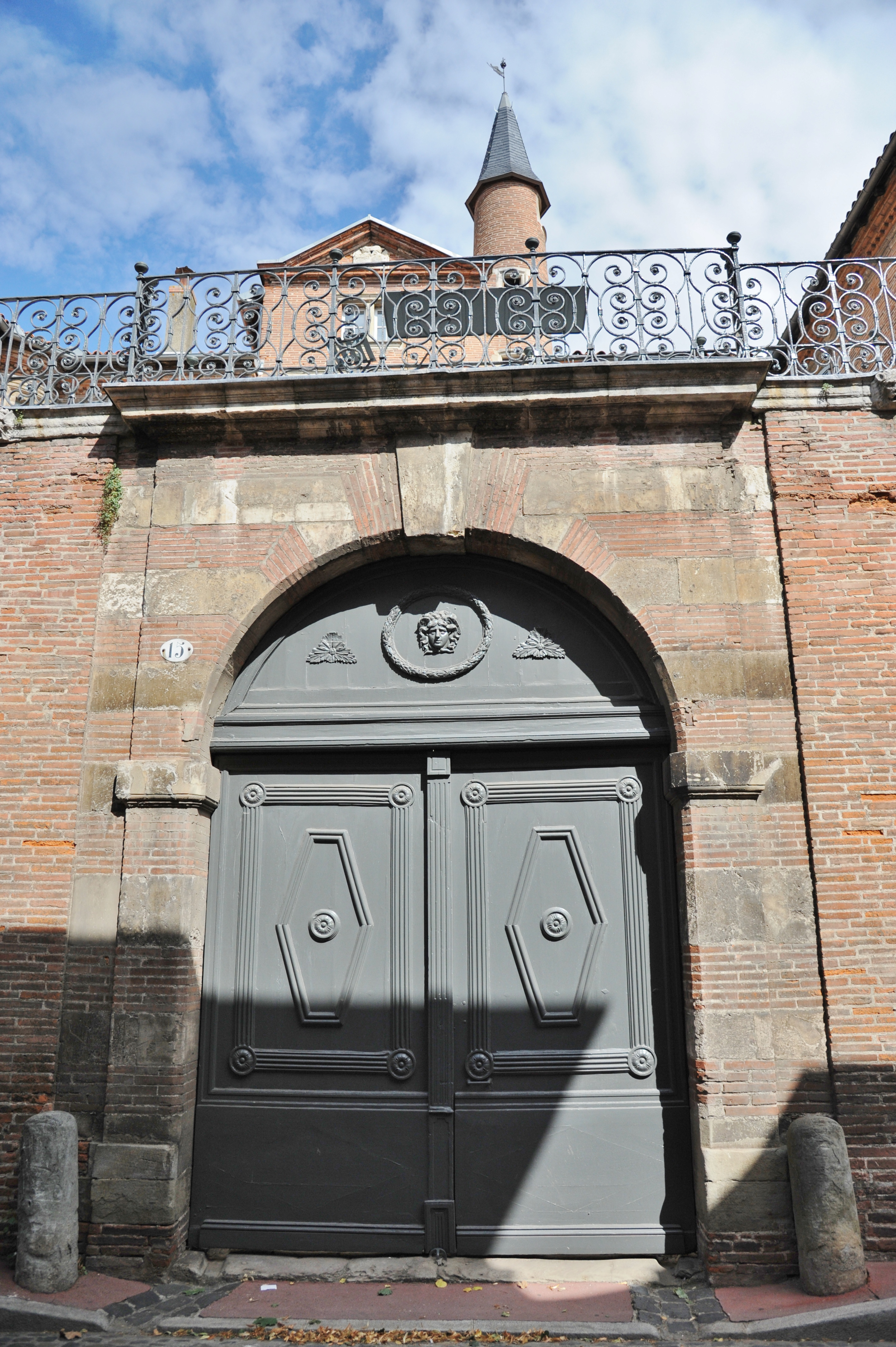
Entrance gate

== See also ==
- Renaissance architecture of Toulouse

== Bibliography ==
- Bruno Tollon, Hôtels de Toulouse, p. 310-313, in Congrès archéologique de France. 154e session. Monuments en Toulousain et Comminges. 1996, Société Française d'Archéologie, Paris, 2002
- Guy Ahlsell de Toulza, Louis Peyrusse, Bruno Tollon, Hôtels et Demeures de Toulouse et du Midi Toulousain, Daniel Briand éditeur, Drémil Lafage, 1997
