= List of things named after Pierre de Fermat =

This is a list of things named after Pierre de Fermat, a French amateur mathematician.

- Fermat–Apollonius circle
- Fermat–Catalan conjecture
- Fermat cubic
- Fermat curve
- Fermat–Euler theorem
- Fermat number
- Fermat point
- Fermat–Weber problem
- Fermat polygonal number theorem
- Fermat polynomial
- Fermat primality test
- Fermat pseudoprime
- Fermat quintic threefold
- Fermat quotient
- Fermat's difference quotient
- Fermat's factorization method
- Fermat's Last Theorem
- Fermat's little theorem
- Fermat's method
- Fermat's method of descent
- Fermat's principle
- Fermat's right triangle theorem
- Fermat's spiral
- Fermat's theorem (stationary points)
- Fermat's theorem on sums of two squares
- Fermat theory
- Pell–Fermat equation
- 12007 Fermat

== Other ==
- Fermat (computer algebra system)
- Fermat (crater)
- Fermat Prize
