= Differential of a function =

Notion in calculus

In calculus, the differential represents the principal part of the change in a function $y = f(x)$ with respect to changes in the independent variable. The differential $dy$ is defined by
$$dy = f'(x)\,dx$$
where:

$f'(x)$ is the derivative of f with respect to $x$, and
$dx$ is an additional real variable (so that $dy$ is a function of $x$ and $dx$).

The notation is such that the equation:

$$dy = \frac{dy}{dx}\, dx$$

holds, where the derivative is represented in the Leibniz notation $dy/dx$, and this is consistent with regarding the derivative as the quotient of the differentials. One also writes

$$df(x) = f'(x)\,dx.$$

The precise meaning of the variables $dy$ and $dx$ depends on the context of the application and the required level of mathematical rigor. The domain of these variables may take on a particular geometrical significance if the differential is regarded as a particular differential form, or analytical significance if the differential is regarded as a linear approximation to the increment of a function. Traditionally, the variables $dx$ and $dy$ are considered to be very small (infinitesimal), and this interpretation is made rigorous in non-standard analysis.

== History and usage ==
The differential was first introduced via an intuitive or heuristic definition by Isaac Newton and furthered by Gottfried Leibniz, who thought of the differential dy as an infinitely small (or infinitesimal) change in the value y of the function, corresponding to an infinitely small change dx in the function's argument x. For that reason, the instantaneous rate of change of y with respect to x, which is the value of the derivative of the function, is denoted by the fraction

$$\frac{dy}{dx}$$
in what is called the Leibniz notation for derivatives. The quotient $dy/dx$ is not infinitely small; rather it is a real number.

The use of infinitesimals in this form was widely criticized, for instance by the famous pamphlet The Analyst by Bishop Berkeley. Augustin-Louis Cauchy (1823) defined the differential without appeal to the atomism of Leibniz's infinitesimals. Instead, Cauchy, following d'Alembert, inverted the logical order of Leibniz and his successors: the derivative itself became the fundamental object, defined as a limit of difference quotients, and the differentials were then defined in terms of it. That is, one was free to define the differential $dy$ by an expression
$$dy = f'(x)\,dx$$
in which $dy$ and $dx$ are simply new variables taking finite real values, not fixed infinitesimals as they had been for Leibniz.

According to Boyer (1959, p. 12), Cauchy's approach was a significant logical improvement over the infinitesimal approach of Leibniz because, instead of invoking the metaphysical notion of infinitesimals, the quantities $dy$ and $dx$ could now be manipulated in exactly the same manner as any other real quantities in a meaningful way. Cauchy's overall conceptual approach to differentials remains the standard one in modern analytical treatments, although the final word on rigor, a fully modern notion of the limit, was ultimately due to Karl Weierstrass.

In physical treatments, such as those applied to the theory of thermodynamics, the infinitesimal view still prevails. Courant & John (1999, p. 184) reconcile the physical use of infinitesimal differentials with the mathematical impossibility of them as follows. The differentials represent finite non-zero values that are smaller than the degree of accuracy required for the particular purpose for which they are intended. Thus "physical infinitesimals" need not appeal to a corresponding mathematical infinitesimal in order to have a precise sense.

Following twentieth-century developments in mathematical analysis and differential geometry, it became clear that the notion of the differential of a function could be extended in a variety of ways. In real analysis, it is more desirable to deal directly with the differential as the principal part of the increment of a function. This leads directly to the notion that the differential of a function at a point is a linear functional of an increment $\Delta x$. This approach allows the differential (as a linear map) to be developed for a variety of more sophisticated spaces, ultimately giving rise to such notions as the Fréchet or Gateaux derivative. Likewise, in differential geometry, the differential of a function at a point is a linear function of a tangent vector (an "infinitely small displacement"), which exhibits it as a kind of one-form: the exterior derivative of the function. In non-standard calculus, differentials are regarded as infinitesimals, which can themselves be put on a rigorous footing (see differential (infinitesimal)).

== Definition ==
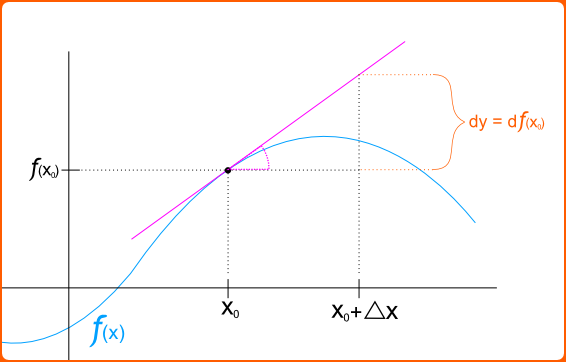
The differential of a function $f(x)$ at a point $x_0$.

The differential is defined in modern treatments of differential calculus as follows. The differential of a function $f(x)$ of a single real variable $x$ is the function $df$ of two independent real variables $x$ and $\Delta x$ given by

$$df(x, \Delta x) \ \stackrel{\mathrm{def}}{=} \ f'(x)\,\Delta x.$$

One or both of the arguments may be suppressed, i.e., one may see $df(x)$ or simply $df$. If $y = f(x)$, the differential may also be written as $dy$. Since $dx(x,\Delta x)=\Delta x$, it is conventional to write $dx=\Delta x$ so that the following equality holds:

$$df(x) = f'(x) \, dx$$

This notion of differential is broadly applicable when a linear approximation to a function is sought, in which the value of the increment $\Delta x$ is small enough. More precisely, if $f$ is a differentiable function at $x$, then the difference in $y$-values

$$\Delta y \ \stackrel{\rm{def}}{=}\ f(x+\Delta x) - f(x)$$

satisfies

$$\Delta y = f'(x)\,\Delta x + \varepsilon = df(x) + \varepsilon\,$$

where the error $\varepsilon$ in the approximation satisfies $\varepsilon /\Delta x\rightarrow 0$ as $\Delta x\rightarrow 0$. In other words, one has the approximate identity

$$\Delta y \approx dy$$

in which the error can be made as small as desired relative to $\Delta x$ by constraining $\Delta x$ to be sufficiently small; that is to say,
$$\frac{\Delta y - dy}{\Delta x}\to 0$$
as $\Delta x\rightarrow 0$. For this reason, the differential of a function is known as the principal (linear) part in the increment of a function: the differential is a linear function of the increment $\Delta x$, and although the error $\varepsilon$ may be nonlinear, it tends to zero rapidly as $\Delta x$ tends to zero.

== Differentials in several variables ==
Operator / Function	$f(x)$	$f(x, y, u(x, y), v(x, y))$
Differential	1: $df \, \overset{\underset{\mathrm{def}}{}}{=} \, f'_x\,dx$	2: $d_x f \, \overset{\underset{\mathrm{def}}{}}{=} \, f'_x\,dx$ 3: $df \, \overset{\underset{\mathrm{def}}{}}{=} \, f'_x dx + f'_y dy + f'_u du + f'_v dv$
Partial derivative	$f'_x \, \overset{\underset{\mathrm{(1)}}{}}{=} \, \frac{df}{dx}$	$f'_x \, \overset{\underset{\mathrm{(2)}}{}}{=} \, \frac{d_x f}{dx} = \frac{\partial f}{\partial x}$
Total derivative	$\frac{df}{dx} \, \overset{\underset{\mathrm{(1)}}{}}{=} \, f'_x$	$\frac{df}{dx} \, \overset{\underset{\mathrm{(3)}}{}}{=} \, f'_x + f'_u \frac{du}{dx} + f'_v \frac{dv}{dx}; (f'_y \frac{dy}{dx} = 0)$

Following Goursat (1904, I, §15), for functions of more than one independent variable,

$$y = f(x_1,\dots,x_n),$$

the partial differential of y with respect to any one of the variables x_{i} is the principal part of the change in y resulting from a change dx_{i} in that one variable. The partial differential is therefore

$$\frac{\partial y}{\partial x_i} dx_i$$

involving the partial derivative of y with respect to x_{i}. The sum of the partial differentials with respect to all of the independent variables is the total differential

$$dy = \frac{\partial y}{\partial x_1} dx_1 + \cdots + \frac{\partial y}{\partial x_n} dx_n,$$

which is the principal part of the change in y resulting from changes in the independent variables x_{i}.

More precisely, in the context of multivariable calculus, following Courant (1937b), if f is a differentiable function, then by the definition of differentiability, the increment

$$\begin{align}
\Delta y &{}~\stackrel{\mathrm{def}}{=}~ f(x_1+\Delta x_1, \dots, x_n+\Delta x_n) - f(x_1,\dots,x_n)\\
&{}= \frac{\partial y}{\partial x_1} \Delta x_1 + \cdots + \frac{\partial y}{\partial x_n} \Delta x_n + \varepsilon_1\Delta x_1 +\cdots+\varepsilon_n\Delta x_n
\end{align}$$

where the error terms ε_{i} tend to zero as the increments Δx_{i} jointly tend to zero. The total differential is then rigorously defined as

$$dy = \frac{\partial y}{\partial x_1} \Delta x_1 + \cdots + \frac{\partial y}{\partial x_n} \Delta x_n.$$

Since, with this definition,
$$dx_i(\Delta x_1,\dots,\Delta x_n) = \Delta x_i,$$
one has
$$dy = \frac{\partial y}{\partial x_1}\,d x_1 + \cdots + \frac{\partial y}{\partial x_n}\,d x_n.$$

As in the case of one variable, the approximate identity holds

$$dy \approx \Delta y$$

in which the total error can be made as small as desired relative to $\sqrt{\Delta x_1^2+\cdots +\Delta x_n^2}$ by confining attention to sufficiently small increments.

=== Application of the total differential to error estimation ===
In measurement, the total differential is used in estimating the error $\Delta f$ of a function $f$ based on the errors $\Delta x,\Delta y,\ldots$ of the parameters $x, y, \ldots$. Assuming that the interval is short enough for the change to be approximately linear:

$$\Delta f(x)=f'(x)\Delta x$$

and that the parameters $x, y, \ldots$ are functionally independent, so that the total differential applies, the change in $f$ induced by simultaneous changes in all parameters is

$$\Delta f \approx f_x \Delta x + f_y \Delta y + \cdots .$$

The derivative $f_x$ with respect to the parameter $x$ gives the sensitivity of the function $f$ to a change in $x$, in particular to the error $\Delta x$. How the individual errors $\Delta x, \Delta y, \ldots$ combine into a bound on $\Delta f$ depends on what is known about them.

If the errors are known only as bounds on magnitude (i.e., $|\Delta x| \le \delta x$, etc.) and may have arbitrary signs, the corresponding worst-case bound on $\Delta f$ is obtained by taking absolute values, since signed contributions could otherwise cancel:

$$|\Delta f| \le |f_x|\, \delta x + |f_y|\, \delta y + \cdots .$$

If instead the errors are modelled as statistically independent random variables with standard deviations $\sigma_x, \sigma_y, \ldots$, then by propagation of variance the standard deviation of $\Delta f$ adds in quadrature:

$$\sigma_f^2 = f_x^2\, \sigma_x^2 + f_y^2\, \sigma_y^2 + \cdots .$$

The first formula is a deterministic upper bound, the second a typical (one-standard-deviation) estimate; the two coincide only in the trivial single-variable case.

From the worst-case principle the familiar error rules of summation, multiplication, etc. are derived, e.g.:

Let $f(a,b) = ab$. Then the finite error can be approximated as

$$\Delta f = f_a \Delta a + f_b \Delta b.$$
Evaluating the derivatives:
$$\Delta f = b \Delta a + a \Delta b.$$
Dividing by f, which is a × b

$$\frac{\Delta f}{f} = \frac{\Delta a}{a} + \frac{\Delta b}{b}.$$

That is to say, in multiplication, the total relative error is the sum of the relative errors of the parameters.

To illustrate how this depends on the function considered, consider the case where the function is $f(a,b)=a\ln b$ instead. Then, it can be computed that the error estimate is
$$\frac{\Delta f}{f} = \frac{\Delta a}{a} + \frac{\Delta b}{b \ln b}$$
with an extra ln b factor not found in the case of a simple product. This additional factor tends to make the error smaller, as the denominator b ln b is larger than a bare b.

== Higher-order differentials ==
Higher-order differentials of a function y = f(x) of a single variable x can be defined via:
$$d^2y = d(dy) = d(f'(x)dx) = (df'(x))dx = f''(x)\,(dx)^2,$$
and, in general,
$$d^ny = f^{(n)}(x)\,(dx)^n.$$
Informally, this motivates Leibniz's notation for higher-order derivatives
$$f^{(n)}(x) = \frac{d^n f}{dx^n}.$$
When the independent variable x itself is permitted to depend on other variables, then the expression becomes more complicated, as it must include also higher order differentials in x itself. Thus, for instance,
$$\begin{align}
d^2 y &= f''(x)\,(dx)^2 + f'(x)d^2x \\[1ex]
d^3 y &= f'''(x)\, (dx)^3 + 3f''(x)dx\,d^2x + f'(x)d^3x
\end{align}$$
and so forth.

Similar considerations apply to defining higher order differentials of functions of several variables. For example, if f is a function of two variables x and y, then
$$d^nf = \sum_{k=0}^n \binom{n}{k}\frac{\partial^n f}{\partial x^k \partial y^{n-k}}(dx)^k(dy)^{n-k},$$
where $\binom{n}{k}$ is a binomial coefficient. In more variables, an analogous expression holds, but with an appropriate multinomial expansion rather than binomial expansion.

Higher order differentials in several variables also become more complicated when the independent variables are themselves allowed to depend on other variables. For instance, for a function f of x and y which are allowed to depend on auxiliary variables, one has
$$d^2f = \left(\frac{\partial^2f}{\partial x^2} (dx)^2 + 2\frac{\partial^2f}{\partial x\partial y} dx\,dy + \frac{\partial^2f}{\partial y^2} (dy)^2\right) + \frac{\partial f}{\partial x}d^2x + \frac{\partial f}{\partial y} d^2y.$$

Because of this notational awkwardness, the use of higher order differentials was roundly criticized by Hadamard (1935), who concluded:

Enfin, que signifie ou que représente l'égalité

$$d^2z = r\,dx^2 + 2s\,dx\,dy + t\,dy^2\,?$$

A mon avis, rien du tout.

That is: Finally, what is meant, or represented, by the equality [...]? In my opinion, nothing at all. In spite of this skepticism, higher order differentials did emerge as an important tool in analysis.

In these contexts, the n-th order differential of the function f applied to an increment Δx is defined by
$$d^nf(x,\Delta x) = \left.\frac{d^n}{dt^n} f(x+t\Delta x)\right|_{t=0}$$
or an equivalent expression, such as
$$\lim_{t\to 0}\frac{\Delta^n_{t\Delta x} f}{t^n}$$
where $\Delta^n_{t\Delta x} f$ is an nth forward difference with increment tΔx.

This definition makes sense as well if f is a function of several variables (for simplicity taken here as a vector argument). Then the n-th differential defined in this way is a homogeneous function of degree n in the vector increment Δx. Furthermore, the Taylor series of f at the point x is given by
$$f(x+\Delta x) \sim f(x) + df(x,\Delta x) + \frac{1}{2}d^2f(x,\Delta x) + \cdots + \frac{1}{n!} d^n f(x,\Delta x) + \cdots$$
The higher order Gateaux derivative generalizes these considerations to infinite dimensional spaces.

== Properties ==
A number of properties of the differential follow in a straightforward manner from the corresponding properties of the derivative, partial derivative, and total derivative. These include:

- Linearity: For constants a and b and differentiable functions f and g,
  $$d(af+bg) = a\,df + b\,dg.$$
- Product rule: For two differentiable functions f and g,
  $$d(fg) = f\,dg+g\,df.$$

An operation d with these two properties is known in abstract algebra as a derivation. They imply the power rule
$$d( f^n ) = n f^{n-1} df$$
In addition, various forms of the chain rule hold, in increasing level of generality:

- If y = f(u) is a differentiable function of the variable u and u = g(x) is a differentiable function of x, then
  $$dy = f'(u)\,du = f'(g(x))g'(x)\,dx.$$
- If y = f(x_{1}, ..., x_{n}) and all of the variables x_{1}, ..., x_{n} depend on another variable t, then by the chain rule for partial derivatives, one has
  $$\begin{align}
dy = \frac{dy}{dt} dt
&= \frac{\partial y}{\partial x_1} dx_1 + \cdots + \frac{\partial y}{\partial x_n} dx_n\\[1ex]
&= \frac{\partial y}{\partial x_1} \frac{dx_1}{dt} \, dt + \cdots + \frac{\partial y}{\partial x_n} \frac{dx_n}{dt} \, dt.
\end{align}$$
  Heuristically, the chain rule for several variables can itself be understood by dividing through both sides of this equation by the infinitely small quantity dt.
- More general analogous expressions hold, in which the intermediate variables x_{i} depend on more than one variable.

== General formulation ==
A consistent notion of differential can be developed for a function f : R^{n} → R^{m} between two Euclidean spaces. Let x,Δx ∈ R^{n} be a pair of Euclidean vectors. The increment in the function f is
$$\Delta f = f(\mathbf{x}+\Delta\mathbf{x}) - f(\mathbf{x}).$$
If there exists an m × n matrix A such that
$$\Delta f = A\Delta\mathbf{x} + \|\Delta\mathbf{x}\|\boldsymbol{\varepsilon}$$
in which the vector ε → 0 as Δx → 0, then f is by definition differentiable at the point x. The matrix A is sometimes known as the Jacobian matrix, and the linear transformation that associates to the increment Δx ∈ R^{n} the vector AΔx ∈ R^{m} is, in this general setting, known as the differential df(x) of f at the point x. This is precisely the Fréchet derivative, and the same construction can be made to work for a function between any Banach spaces.

Another fruitful point of view is to define the differential directly as a kind of directional derivative:
$$df(\mathbf{x},\mathbf{h}) = \lim_{t\to 0}\frac{f(\mathbf{x}+t\mathbf{h})-f(\mathbf{x})}{t} = \left.\frac{d}{dt} f(\mathbf{x}+t\mathbf{h})\right|_{t=0},$$
which is the approach already taken for defining higher order differentials (and is most nearly the definition set forth by Cauchy). If t represents time and x position, then h represents a velocity instead of a displacement as we have heretofore regarded it. This yields yet another refinement of the notion of differential: that it should be a linear function of a kinematic velocity. The set of all velocities through a given point of space is known as the tangent space, and so df gives a linear function on the tangent space: a differential form. With this interpretation, the differential of f is known as the exterior derivative, and has broad application in differential geometry because the notion of velocities and the tangent space makes sense on any differentiable manifold. If, in addition, the output value of f also represents a position (in a Euclidean space), then a dimensional analysis confirms that the output value of df must be a velocity. If one treats the differential in this manner, then it is known as the pushforward since it "pushes" velocities from a source space into velocities in a target space.

== Other approaches ==
Although the notion of having an infinitesimal increment dx is not well-defined in modern mathematical analysis, a variety of techniques exist for defining the infinitesimal differential so that the differential of a function can be handled in a manner that does not clash with the Leibniz notation. These include:

- Defining the differential as a kind of differential form, specifically the exterior derivative of a function. The infinitesimal increments are then identified with vectors in the tangent space at a point. This approach is popular in differential geometry and related fields, because it readily generalizes to mappings between differentiable manifolds.
- Differentials as nilpotent elements of commutative rings. This approach is popular in algebraic geometry.
- Differentials in smooth models of set theory. This approach is known as synthetic differential geometry or smooth infinitesimal analysis and is closely related to the algebraic geometric approach, except that ideas from topos theory are used to hide the mechanisms by which nilpotent infinitesimals are introduced.
- Differentials as infinitesimals in hyperreal number systems, which are extensions of the real numbers which contain invertible infinitesimals and infinitely large numbers. This is the approach of nonstandard analysis pioneered by Abraham Robinson.

== Examples and applications ==
Differentials may be effectively used in numerical analysis to study the propagation of experimental errors in a calculation, and thus the overall numerical stability of a problem (Courant 1937a). Suppose that the variable x represents the outcome of an experiment and y is the result of a numerical computation applied to x. The question is to what extent errors in the measurement of x influence the outcome of the computation of y. If the x is known to within Δx of its true value, then Taylor's theorem gives the following estimate on the error Δy in the computation of y:
$$\Delta y = f'(x)\Delta x + \frac{(\Delta x)^2}{2}f''(\xi)$$
where ξ = x + θΔx for some 0 < θ < 1. If Δx is small, then the second order term is negligible, so that Δy is, for practical purposes, well-approximated by dy = f'(x) Δx.

The differential is often useful to rewrite a differential equation
$$\frac{dy}{dx} = g(x)$$
in the form
$$dy = g(x)\,dx,$$
in particular when one wants to separate the variables.

== See also ==
- Notation for differentiation
