= Polynomial Diophantine equation =

In mathematics, a polynomial Diophantine equation is an indeterminate polynomial equation for which one seeks solutions restricted to be polynomials in the indeterminate. A Diophantine equation, in general, is one where the solutions are restricted to some algebraic system, typically integers. (In another usage ) Diophantine refers to the Hellenistic mathematician of the 3rd century, Diophantus of Alexandria, who made initial studies of integer Diophantine equations.

An important type of polynomial Diophantine equations takes the form:

$$sa+tb=c$$

where a, b, and c are known polynomials, and we wish to solve for s and t.

A simple example (and a solution) is:

$$s(x^2+1)+t(x^3+1)=2x$$
$$s=-x^3-x^2+x$$
$$t=x^2+x.$$

A necessary and sufficient condition for a polynomial Diophantine equation to have a solution is for c to be a multiple of the GCD of a and b. In the example above, the GCD of a and b was 1, so solutions would exist for any value of c.

Solutions to polynomial Diophantine equations are not unique. Any multiple of $ab$ (say $rab$) can be used to transform $s$ and $t$ into another solution $s'=s+rb$ $t'=t-ra$:

$$(s+rb)a+(t-ra)b=c.$$

Some polynomial Diophantine equations can be solved using the extended Euclidean algorithm, which works as well with polynomials as it does with integers.
