= David Sherry =

David Sherry may refer to:

- David Sherry (philosopher), American philosopher
- David Sherry (artist) (born 1974), artist from Northern Ireland
- David Benjamin Sherry (born 1981), American photographer
