= Claude Gaspar Bachet de Méziriac =

French mathematician (1581–1638)

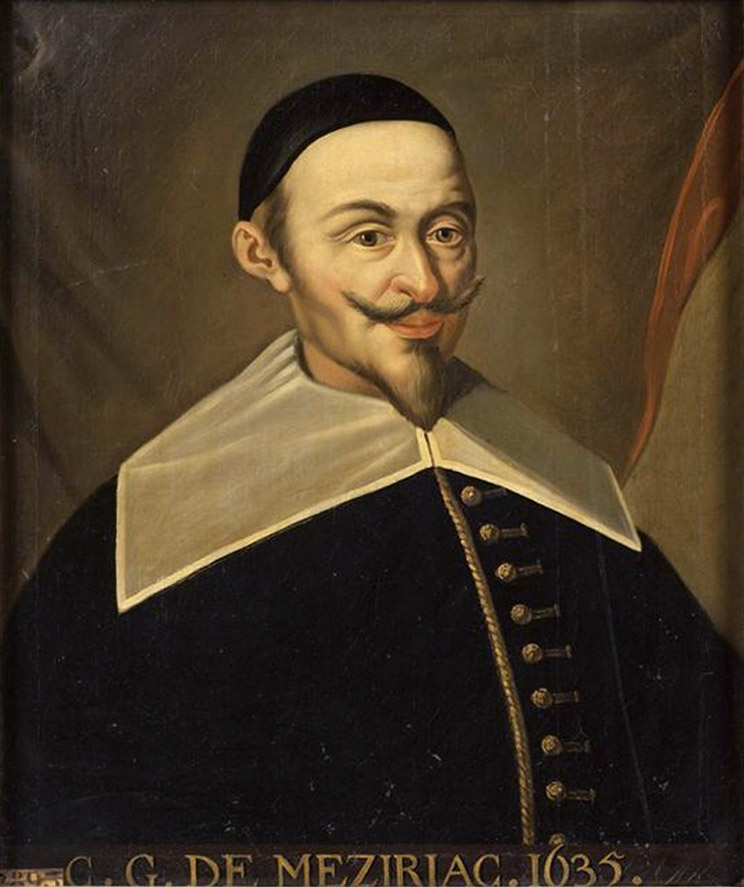
- Born: 9 October 1581; Bourg-en-Bresse, Duchy of Savoy
- Died: 26 February 1638 (aged 56); Bourg-en-Bresse, Duchy of Savoy
- Occupation: Mathematician
- Notable work: Problèmes plaisans et délectables qui se font par les nombres; Les éléments arithmétiques

Claude Gaspar Bachet Sieur de Méziriac (9 October 1581 – 26 February 1638) was a French mathematician and poet born in Bourg-en-Bresse, at that time belonging to Duchy of Savoy. He wrote Problèmes plaisans et délectables qui se font par les nombres, (Note: French for 'Pleasant and delectable problems that are done by numbers') Les éléments arithmétiques, (Note: French for 'Arithmetical elements') and a Latin translation of the Arithmetica of Diophantus (the very translation where Fermat wrote a margin note about Fermat's Last Theorem). He also discovered means of solving indeterminate equations using continued fractions, a method of constructing magic squares, and a proof of Bézout's identity.

== Biography ==
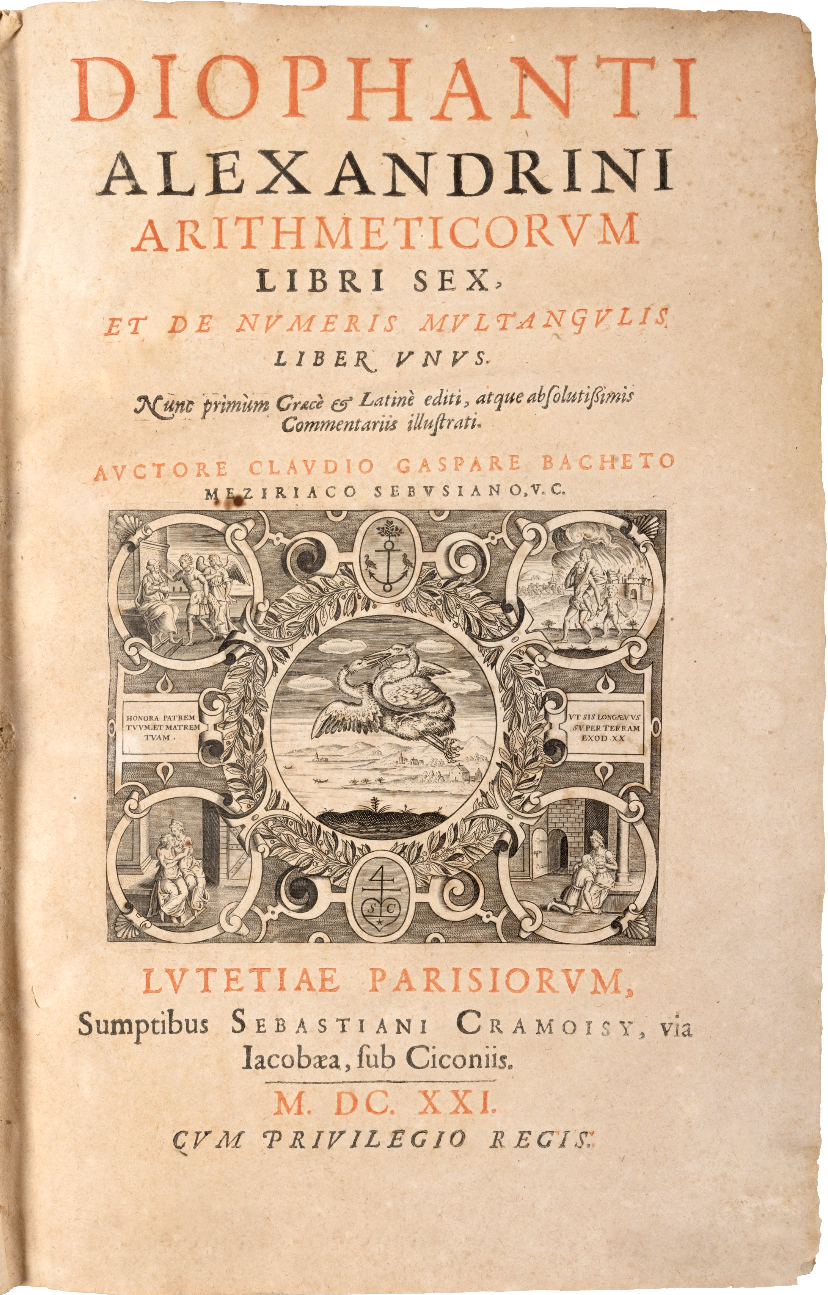
Title page of the 1621 edition of Diophantus' Arithmetica, translated into Latin by Claude Gaspard Bachet de Méziriac.

Claude Gaspar Bachet de Méziriac was born in Bourg-en-Bresse on 9 October 1581. By the time he reached the age of six, both his mother (Marie de Chavanes) and his father (Jean Bachet) had died. He was then looked after by the Jesuit Order. For a year in 1601, Bachet was a member of the Jesuit Order (he left due to an illness).

Bachet lived a comfortable life in Bourg-en-Bresse. He married Philiberte de Chabeu in 1620 and had seven children.

Bachet was a pupil of the Jesuit mathematician Jacques de Billy at the Jesuit College in Rheims. They became close friends.

Bachet wrote the Problèmes plaisans et délectables qui se font par les nombres of which the first edition was issued in 1612, a second and enlarged edition was brought out in 1624; this contains an interesting collection of arithmetical tricks and questions, many of which are quoted in W. W. Rouse Ball's Mathematical Recreations and Essays.

He also wrote Les éléments arithmétiques, which exists in manuscript; and a translation, from Greek to Latin, of the Arithmetica of Diophantus (1621). It was this very translation in which Fermat wrote his famous margin note claiming that he had a proof of Fermat's Last Theorem. The same text renders Diophantus' term παρισὀτης as adaequalitat, which became Fermat's technique of adequality, a pioneering method of infinitesimal calculus.

Bachet was the earliest writer who discussed the solution of indeterminate equations by means of continued fractions. He also did work in number theory and found a method of constructing magic squares. In the second edition of his Problèmes plaisants (1624) he gives a proof of Bézout's identity (as proposition XVIII) 142 years before it got published by Bézout.

He was elected member of the Académie française in 1635.
