= Skew gradient =

Mathematical concept

In mathematics, a skew gradient of a harmonic function over a simply connected domain with two real dimensions is a vector field that is everywhere orthogonal to the gradient of the function and that has the same magnitude as the gradient.

== Definition ==
The skew gradient can be defined using complex analysis and the Cauchy–Riemann equations.

Let $f(z(x,y))=u(x,y)+iv(x,y)$ be a complex-valued analytic function, where u,v are real-valued scalar functions of the real variables x, y.

A skew gradient is defined as:

$$\nabla^\perp u(x,y)=\nabla v(x,y)$$

and from the Cauchy–Riemann equations, it is derived that

$$\nabla^\perp u(x,y)=(-\frac{\partial u}{\partial y},\frac{\partial u}{\partial x})$$

== Properties ==
The skew gradient has two interesting properties. It is everywhere orthogonal to the gradient of u, and of the same length:

$$\nabla u(x,y) \cdot \nabla^\perp u(x,y)=0 ,  \rVert \nabla u\rVert =\rVert \nabla^\perp u\rVert$$
