= Method of normals =

In calculus, the method of normals was a technique invented by Descartes for finding normal and tangent lines to curves. It represented one of the earliest methods for constructing tangents to curves. The method hinges on the observation that the radius of a circle is always normal to the circle itself. With this in mind Descartes would construct a circle that was tangent to a given curve. He could then use the radius at the point of intersection to find the slope of a normal line, and from this one can easily find the slope of a tangent line.

This was discovered about the same time as Fermat's method of adequality. While Fermat's method had more in common with the infinitesimal techniques that were to be used later, Descartes' method was more influential in the early history of calculus. (Katz 2008)

One reason Descartes' method fell from favor was the algebraic complexity it involved. On the other hand, this method can be used to rigorously define the derivative for a wide class of functions using neither infinitesimal nor limit techniques. It is also related to a completely general definition of differentiability given by Carathéodory (Range 2011).
