= Adequality =

Mathematical procedure equivalent to differential calculus

Adequality is a technique developed by Pierre de Fermat in his treatise Methodus ad disquirendam maximam et minimam (a Latin treatise circulated in France c. 1636 ) to calculate maxima and minima of functions, tangents to curves, area, center of mass, least action, and other problems in calculus.

== Etymology ==
According to André Weil, Fermat "introduces the technical term adaequalitas, adaequare, etc., which he says he has borrowed from Diophantus. As Diophantus V.11 shows, it means an approximate equality, and this is indeed how Fermat explains the word in one of his later writings." (Weil 1973). Diophantus coined the word παρισότης (parisotēs) to refer to an approximate equality. Claude Gaspard Bachet de Méziriac translated Diophantus's Greek word into Latin as adaequalitas. Paul Tannery's French translation of Fermat's Latin treatises on maxima and minima used the words adéquation and adégaler.

== Formulation ==
Fermat used adequality first to find maxima of functions, and then adapted it to find tangent lines to curves.

To find the maximum of a term $p(x)$, Fermat approximately equated (that is, adequated) $p(x)$ and $p(x+e)$ and after doing algebra (such as a Taylor series approximation) he could cancel out a factor of $e,$ and then discard any remaining terms involving $e.$

To illustrate the method by Fermat's own example, consider the problem of finding the maximum of $p(x)=bx-x^2$ (in Fermat's words, it is to divide a line of length $b$ at a point $x$, such that the product of the two resulting parts be a maximum). Fermat adequated $bx-x^2$ with $b(x+e)-(x+e)^2=bx-x^2+be-2ex-e^2$. That is (using the notation $\backsim$ to denote adequality, introduced by Paul Tannery):

$$bx-x^2\backsim bx-x^2+be-2ex-e^2.$$

Canceling terms and dividing by $e$ Fermat arrived at

$$b\backsim 2x+e.$$

Removing the terms that contained $e$ Fermat arrived at the desired result that the maximum occurred when $x=b/2$.

Fermat also used his principle to give a mathematical derivation of Snell's laws of refraction directly from his principle that light takes the quickest path.

== Descartes's criticism ==
Fermat's method was highly criticized by his contemporaries, particularly Descartes. Victor Katz suggests this is because Descartes had independently discovered the same new mathematics, known as his method of normals, and Descartes was quite proud of his discovery. Katz also notes that while Fermat's methods were closer to the future developments in calculus, Descartes's methods had a more immediate impact on the development.

== Scholarly controversy ==
Both Newton and Leibniz referred to Fermat's work as an antecedent of infinitesimal calculus. Nevertheless, there is disagreement amongst modern scholars about the exact meaning of Fermat's adequality. Fermat's adequality was analyzed in a number of scholarly studies. In 1896, Paul Tannery published a French translation of Fermat's Latin treatises on maxima and minima (Fermat, Œuvres, Vol. III, pp. 121–156). Tannery translated Fermat's term as “adégaler” and adopted Fermat's “adéquation”. Tannery also introduced the symbol $\backsim$ for adequality in mathematical formulas.

Heinrich Wieleitner (1929) wrote:

Fermat replaces A with A+E. Then he sets the new expression roughly equal (angenähert gleich) to the old one, cancels equal terms on both sides, and divides by the highest possible power of E. He then cancels all terms which contain E and sets those that remain equal to each other. From that [the required] A results. That E should be as small as possible is nowhere said and is at best expressed by the word "adaequalitas".

(Wieleitner uses the symbol $\scriptstyle\sim$.)

Max Miller (1934) wrote:

Thereupon one should put the both terms, which express the maximum and the minimum, approximately equal (näherungsweise gleich), as Diophantus says.

(Miller uses the symbol $\scriptstyle \approx$.)

Jean Itard (1948) wrote:

One knows that the expression "adégaler" is adopted by Fermat from Diophantus, translated by Xylander and by Bachet. It is about an approximate equality (égalité approximative) ".

(Itard uses the symbol $\scriptstyle \backsim$.)

Joseph Ehrenfried Hofmann (1963) wrote:

Fermat chooses a quantity h, thought as sufficiently small, and puts f(x + h) roughly equal (ungefähr gleich) to f(x). His technical term is adaequare.

(Hofmann uses the symbol $\scriptstyle \approx$.)

Peer Strømholm (1968) wrote:

The basis of Fermat's approach was the comparition of two expressions which, though they had the same form, were not exactly equal. This part of the process he called "comparare par adaequalitatem" or "comparer per adaequalitatem", and it implied that the otherwise strict identity between the two sides of the "equation" was destroyed by the modification of the variable by a small amount:

$\scriptstyle f(A){\sim}f(A+E)$.

This, I believe, was the real significance of his use of Diophantos' πἀρισον, stressing the smallness of the variation. The ordinary translation of 'adaequalitas' seems to be "approximate equality", but I much prefer "pseudo-equality" to present Fermat's thought at this point.

He further notes that "there was never in M1 (Method 1) any question of the variation E being put equal to zero. The words Fermat used to express the process of suppressing terms containing E was 'elido', 'deleo', and 'expungo', and in French 'i'efface' and 'i'ôte'. We can hardly believe that a sane man wishing to express his meaning and searching for words, would constantly hit upon such tortuous ways of imparting the simple fact that the terms vanished because E was zero.(p. 51) Claus Jensen (1969) wrote:

Moreover, in applying the notion of adégalité – which constitutes the basis of Fermat's general method of constructing tangents, and by which is meant a comparition of two magnitudes as if they were equal, although they are in fact not ("tamquam essent aequalia, licet revera aequalia non sint") – I will employ the nowadays more usual symbol $\scriptstyle \approx$.

The Latin quotation comes from Tannery's 1891 edition of Fermat, volume 1, page 140. Michael Sean Mahoney (1971) wrote:

Fermat's Method of maxima and minima, which is clearly applicable to any polynomial P(x), originally rested on purely finitistic algebraic foundations. It assumed, counterfactually, the inequality of two equal roots in order to determine, by Viete's theory of equations, a relation between those roots and one of the coefficients of the polynomial, a relation that was fully general. This relation then led to an extreme-value solution when Fermat removed his counterfactual assumption and set the roots equal. Borrowing a term from Diophantus, Fermat called this counterfactual equality 'adequality'.

(Mahoney uses the symbol $\scriptstyle\approx$.) On p. 164, end of footnote 46, Mahoney notes that one of the meanings of adequality is approximate equality or equality in the limiting case. Charles Henry Edwards, Jr. (1979) wrote:

For example, in order to determine how to subdivide a segment of length $\scriptstyle b$ into two segments $\scriptstyle x$ and $\scriptstyle b-x$ whose product $\scriptstyle x(b-x)=bx-x^2$ is maximal, that is to find the rectangle with perimeter $\scriptstyle 2b$ that has the maximal area, he [Fermat] proceeds as follows. First he substituted $\scriptstyle x+e$

(he used A, E instead of x, e) for the unknown x, and then wrote down the following "pseudo-equality" to compare the resulting expression with the original one:

$$\scriptstyle b(x+e)-(x+e)^2=bx+be-x^2-2xe-e^2\; \sim\; bx-x^2.$$

After canceling terms, he divided through by e to obtain $\scriptstyle b-2\,x-e\;\sim\;0.$ Finally he discarded the remaining term containing e, transforming the pseudo-equality into the true equality $\scriptstyle x=\frac{b}{2}$ that gives the value of x which makes $\scriptstyle bx-x^2$ maximal. Unfortunately, Fermat never explained the logical basis for this method with sufficient clarity or completeness to prevent disagreements between historical scholars as to precisely what he meant or intended."

Kirsti Andersen (1980) wrote:

The two expressions of the maximum or minimum are made "adequal", which means something like as nearly equal as possible.

(Andersen uses the symbol $\scriptstyle\approx$.) Herbert Breger (1994) wrote:

I want to put forward my hypothesis: Fermat used the word "adaequare" in the sense of "to put equal" ... In a mathematical context, the only difference between "aequare" and "adaequare" seems to be that the latter gives more stress on the fact that the equality is achieved.

(Page 197f.) John Stillwell (Stillwell 2006 p. 91) wrote:

Fermat introduced the idea of adequality in 1630s but he was ahead of his time. His successors were unwilling to give up the convenience of ordinary equations, preferring to use equality loosely rather than to use adequality accurately. The idea of adequality was revived only in the twentieth century, in the so-called non-standard analysis.

Enrico Giusti (2009) cites Fermat's letter to Marin Mersenne where Fermat wrote:

Cette comparaison par adégalité produit deux termes inégaux qui enfin produisent l'égalité (selon ma méthode) qui nous donne la solution de la question" ("This comparison by adequality produces two unequal terms which finally produce the equality (following my method) which gives us the solution of the problem")..

Giusti notes in a footnote that this letter seems to have escaped Breger's notice.

Klaus Barner (2011) asserts that Fermat uses two different Latin words (aequabitur and adaequabitur) to replace the nowadays usual equals sign, aequabitur when the equation concerns a valid identity between two constants, a universally valid (proved) formula, or a conditional equation, adaequabitur, however, when the equation describes a relation between two variables, which are not independent (and the equation is no valid formula). On page 36, Barner writes: "Why did Fermat continually repeat his inconsistent procedure for all his examples for the method of tangents? Why did he never mention the secant, with which he in fact operated? I do not know."

Katz, Schaps, Shnider (2013) argue that Fermat's application of the technique to transcendental curves such as the cycloid shows that Fermat's technique of adequality goes beyond a purely algebraic algorithm, and that, contrary to Breger's interpretation, the technical terms parisotes as used by Diophantus and adaequalitas as used by Fermat both mean "approximate equality". They develop a formalisation of Fermat's technique of adequality in modern mathematics as the standard part function which rounds off a finite hyperreal number to its nearest real number.

== See also ==
- Fermat's principle
- Transcendental law of homogeneity

== Bibliography ==
- Breger, Herbert (1994). "The mysteries of adaequare: A vindication of fermat". Archive for History of Exact Sciences. 46 (3): 193–219. doi:10.1007/BF01686277. S2CID 119440472.
- Edwards, C. H. (1979). The Historical Development of the Calculus. doi:10.1007/978-1-4612-6230-5. ISBN 978-0-387-94313-8.
- Giusti, E. (2009) "Les méthodes des maxima et minima de Fermat", Ann. Fac. Sci. Toulouse Math. (6) 18, Fascicule Special, 59–85.
- Grabiner, Judith V. (Sep 1983), "The Changing Concept of Change: The Derivative from Fermat to Weierstrass", Mathematics Magazine, 56 (4): 195–206, doi:10.2307/2689807, JSTOR 2689807
- Katz, V. (2008), A History of Mathematics: An Introduction, Addison Wesley
- Stillwell, J.(2006) Yearning for the impossible. The surprising truths of mathematics, page 91, A K Peters, Ltd., Wellesley, MA.
- Weil, A., Book Review: The mathematical career of Pierre de Fermat. Bull. Amer. Math. Soc. 79 (1973), no. 6, 1138–1149.
