= Michael Sean Mahoney =

American historian of science

Michael Sean Mahoney (June 30, 1939 – July 23, 2008) was a historian of science and technology.

Mahoney was born in New York City and did his undergraduate studies at Harvard University, graduating in 1960. He earned a Ph.D. in history and history of science from Princeton University in 1967, and immediately took a position as an assistant professor there. He remained at Princeton for over 40 years, until his death in 2008.

A conference on the history of science and technology was held in his honor at Princeton in May 2009.

== Fermat biography ==
Mahoney's biography of Pierre de Fermat received much critical attention including a scathing review by André Weil in 1973. A second edition of Mahoney's book came out in 1994.

== Selected publications ==
- Mahoney, Michael Sean, The mathematical career of Pierre de Fermat. Princeton University Press, Princeton, N.J., 1973. 2nd edition, 1994, ISBN 0-691-03666-7
- Mahoney, Michael S., Barrow's mathematics: between ancients and moderns. Before Newton, 179–249, Cambridge Univ. Press, Cambridge, 1990.
- Mahoney, Michael, S. and Thomas Haigh (editor). Histories of Computing. Harvard Univ. Press. 2011. Completed posthumously.
