= Diophantus =

3rd-century Greek mathematician

- Διόφαντος
- Born: c. 3rd century CE; Alexandria
- Died: c. 3rd century CE
- Known for: Algebra
- Scientific career
- Notable students: Anatolius of Alexandria (possibly)

Diophantus of Alexandria (/daɪoʊˈfæntəs/; Ancient Greek: Διόφαντος, romanized: Diophantos; fl. 250 CE) was a Greek mathematician who was the author of the Arithmetica in thirteen books, of which ten are extant, made up of arithmetical problems that are solved through algebraic equations.

Joseph-Louis Lagrange called Diophantus "the inventor of algebra"; his exposition became the standard within the Neoplatonic schools of Late antiquity, and its translation into Arabic in the 9th century AD and had influence in the development of later algebra: Diophantus' method of solution matches medieval Arabic algebra in its concepts and overall procedure. The 1621 edition of Arithmetica by Bachet gained fame after Pierre de Fermat wrote his famous "Last Theorem" in the margins of his copy.

In modern use, Diophantine equations are algebraic equations with integer coefficients for which integer solutions are sought. Diophantine geometry and Diophantine approximations are two other subareas of number theory that are named after him. Some problems from the Arithmetica have inspired modern work in both abstract algebra and number theory. As a result of his work, he has sometimes been referred to as the father of algebra.

== Biography ==
The exact details of Diophantus' life are obscure. Although he probably flourished in the third century CE, he may have lived anywhere between 170 BCE, roughly contemporaneous with Hypsicles, the latest author he quotes from, and 350 CE, when Theon of Alexandria quotes from him. Paul Tannery suggested that a reference to an "Anatolius" as a student of Diophantus in the works of Michael Psellos may refer to the early Christian bishop Anatolius of Alexandria, who may possibly the same Anatolius mentioned by Eunapius as a teacher of the pagan Neopythagorean philosopher Iamblichus, either of which would place him in the 3rd century CE.

The only definitive piece of information about his life is derived from a set of mathematical puzzles attributed to the 5th or 6th century CE grammarian Metrodorus preserved in book 14 of the Greek Anthology. One of the problems (sometimes called Diophantus' epitaph) states:

Here lies Diophantus, the wonder behold.
Through art algebraic, the stone tells how old:
God gave him his boyhood one-sixth of his life,
One twelfth more as youth while whiskers grew rife;

And then yet one-seventh ere marriage begun;
In five years there came a bouncing new son.

Alas, the dear child of master and sage
After attaining half the measure of his father's life chill fate took him.
After consoling his fate by the science of numbers for four years, he ended his life.'

This puzzle implies that Diophantus' age x can be expressed as

x = x/6 + x/12 + x/7 + 5 + x/2 + 4

which gives x a value of 84 years. However, the accuracy of the information cannot be confirmed.

== Arithmetica ==
Arithmetica
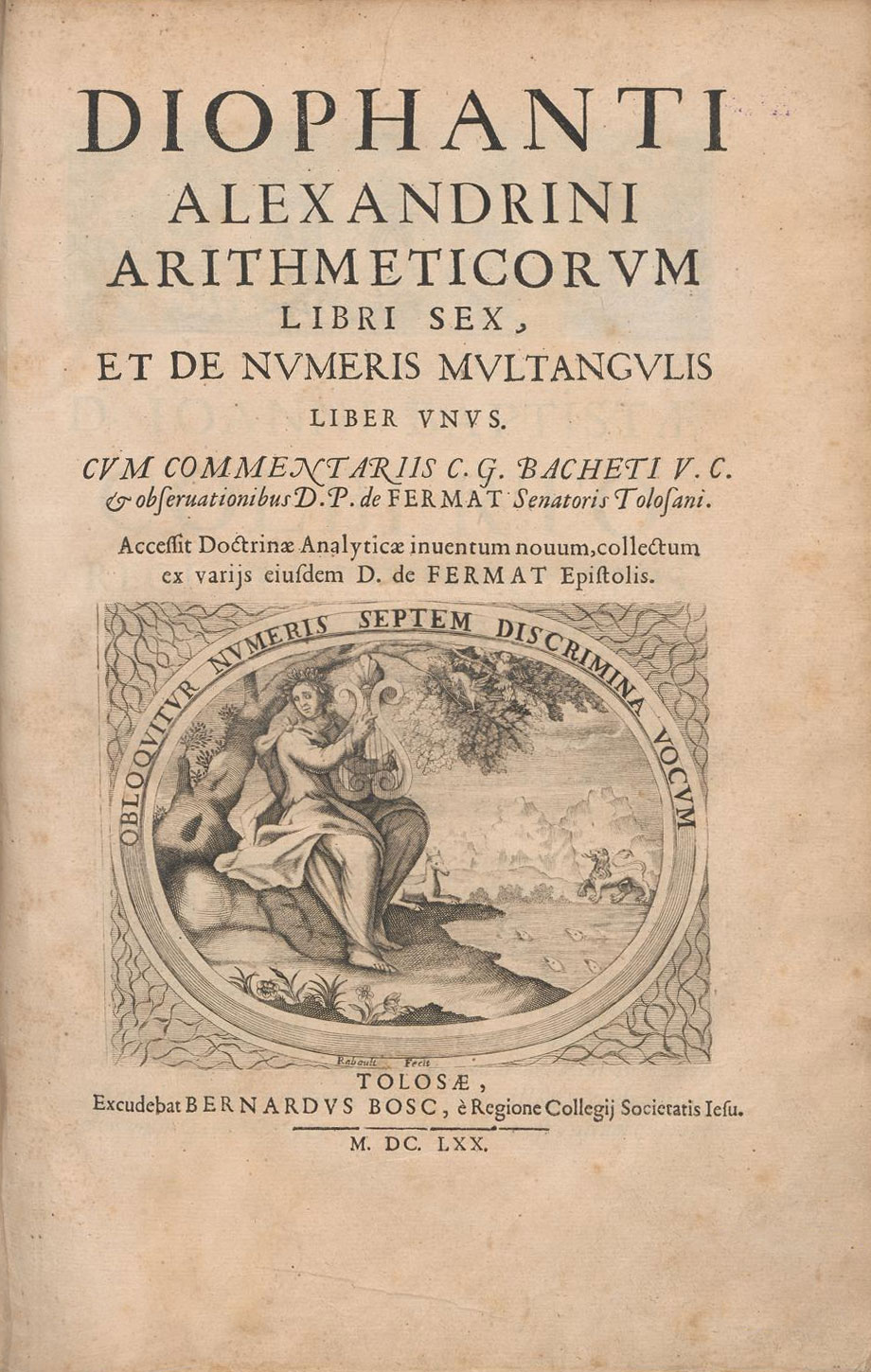
- Title page of the 1670 edition of Arithmetica, containing Pierre de Fermat's commentary.
- Author: Diophantus
- Language: Ancient Greek
- Subject: Algebra, number theory
- Genre: Mathematics textbook
- Publication date: c. 3rd century AD
- Publication place: Roman Egypt (Alexandria)
- Media type: Papyrus scroll (originally)
- Pages: 13 books (6 survive in Greek, 4 survive in Arabic)

Arithmetica is the major work of Diophantus and the most prominent work on premodern algebra in Greek mathematics. It is a collection of 290 algebraic problems giving numerical solutions of determinate equations (those with a unique solution) and indeterminate equations. Arithmetica was originally written in thirteen books, but only six of them survive in Greek, while another four books survive in Arabic, which were discovered in 1968. The books in Arabic correspond to books 4 to 7 of the original treatise, while the Greek books correspond to books 1 to 3 and 8 to 10.

Arithmetica is the earliest extant work present that solve arithmetic problems by algebra. Diophantus however did not invent the method of algebra, which existed before him. Algebra was practiced and diffused orally by practitioners, with Diophantus picking up technique to solve problems in arithmetic.

The book considers finding integer solutions to equations with integer coefficients, a class of problem presently called Diophantine equations. The methods for solving such equations is called Diophantine analysis. Most of the Arithmetica problems lead to quadratic equations.

=== Notation ===
Diophantus introduced an algebraic symbolism that used an abridged notation for frequently occurring operations, and an abbreviation for the unknown and for the powers of the unknown.

Similar to medieval Arabic algebra, Diophantus uses three stages to solution of a problem by algebra:

1. An unknown is named and an equation is set up
2. An equation is simplified to a standard form (al-jabr and al-muqābala in Arabic)
3. Simplified equation is solved

Diophantus does not give classification of equations in six types like Al-Khwarizmi in extant parts of Arithmetica. He does say that he would give solution to three terms equations later, so this part of work is possibly just lost.

The main difference between Diophantine notation and modern algebraic notation is that the former lacked special symbols for operations, relations, and exponentials. So for example, what would be written in modern notation as
$$x^3 - 2x^2 + 10x -1 = 5,$$
which can be rewritten as
$$\left({x^3}1 + {x}10\right) - \left({x^2}2 + {x^0}1\right) = {x^0}5,$$
would be written in Diophantus's notation as

$$\Kappa^{\upsilon} \overline{\alpha} \; \zeta \overline{\iota} \;\, \pitchfork \;\, \Delta^{\upsilon} \overline{\beta} \; \Mu \overline{\alpha} \,\; \text{ἴσ} \;\, \Mu \overline{\varepsilon}$$

| Symbol | What it represents |
|---|---|
| $\overline{\alpha}$ | 1 (Alpha is the 1st letter of the Greek alphabet) |
| $\overline{\beta}$ | 2 (Beta is the 2nd letter of the Greek alphabet) |
| $\overline{\varepsilon}$ | 5 (Epsilon is the 5th letter of the Greek alphabet) |
| $\overline{\iota}$ | 10 (Iota is the 9th letter of the modern Greek alphabet but it was the 10th letter of an ancient archaic Greek alphabet that had the letter digamma (uppercase: Ϝ, lowercase: ϝ) in the 6th position between epsilon ε and zeta ζ.) |
| ἴσ | "equals" (short for ἴσος) |
| $\pitchfork$ | represents the subtraction of everything that follows $\pitchfork$ up to ἴσ |
| $\Mu$ | the zeroth power (that is, a constant term) |
| $\zeta$ | the unknown quantity (because a number $x$ raised to the first power is just $x,$ this may be thought of as "the first power") |
| $\Delta^{\upsilon}$ | the second power, from Greek δύναμις, meaning strength or power |
| $\Kappa^{\upsilon}$ | the third power, from Greek κύβος, meaning a cube |
| $\Delta^{\upsilon}\Delta$ | the fourth power |
| $\Delta\Kappa^{\upsilon}$ | the fifth power |
| $\Kappa^{\upsilon}\Kappa$ | the sixth power |

Unlike in modern notation, the coefficients come after the variables and addition is represented by the juxtaposition of terms. A literal symbol-for-symbol translation of Diophantus's equation into a modern equation would be the following:
$${x^3}1 {x}10 - {x^2}2 {x^0}1 = {x^0}5$$
where to clarify, if the modern parentheses and plus are used then the above equation can be rewritten as:
$$\left({x^3}1 + {x}10\right) - \left({x^2}2 + {x^0}1\right) = {x^0}5$$

=== Contents ===
In Book 3, Diophantus solves problems of finding values which make two linear expressions simultaneously into squares or cubes. In book 4, he finds rational powers between given numbers. He also noticed that numbers of the form $4n + 3$ cannot be the sum of two squares. Diophantus also appears to know that every number can be written as the sum of four squares. If he did know this result (in the sense of having proved it as opposed to merely conjectured it), his doing so would be truly remarkable: even Fermat, who stated the result, failed to provide a proof of it and it was not settled until Joseph-Louis Lagrange proved it using results due to Leonhard Euler.

== Other works ==
Another work by Diophantus, On Polygonal Numbers is transmitted in an incomplete form in four Byzantine manuscripts along with the Arithmetica. Two other lost works by Diophantus are known: Porisms and On Parts.

Recently, Wilbur Knorr has suggested that another book, Preliminaries to the Geometric Elements, traditionally attributed to Hero of Alexandria, may actually be by Diophantus.

=== On polygonal numbers ===
This work on polygonal numbers, a topic that was of great interest to the Pythagoreans consists of a preface and five propositions in its extant form. The treatise breaks off in the middle of a proposition about how many ways a number can be a polygonal number.

=== The Porisms ===
The Porisms was a collection of lemmas along with accompanying proofs. Although The Porisms is lost, we know three lemmas contained there, since Diophantus quotes them in the Arithmetica and refers the reader to the Porisms for the proof.

One lemma states that the difference of the cubes of two rational numbers is equal to the sum of the cubes of two other rational numbers, i.e. given any rational a and b, with a > b > 0, there exist rational c, d > 0 such that

a^{3} − b^{3} = c^{3} + d^{3}.

=== On Parts ===
This work, on fractions, is known by a single reference, a Neoplatonic scholium to Iamblichus' treatise on Nicomachus' Introduction to Arithmetic. Next to a line where Iamblichus writes "Some of the Pythagoreans said that the unit is the borderline between number and parts" the scholiast writes "So Diophantus writes in On Parts, for parts involve progress in diminution carried to infinity."

== Influence ==
Diophantus' work has had a large influence in history. Although Joseph-Louis Lagrange called Diophantus "the inventor of algebra", he did not invent it, however his work Arithmetica created a foundation for work on algebra and in fact much of advanced mathematics is based on algebra. Diophantus and his works influenced mathematics in the medieval Islamic world, and editions of Arithmetica exerted a profound influence on the development of algebra in Europe in the late sixteenth and through the 17th and 18th centuries.

=== Later antiquity ===
After its publication, Diophantus' work continued to be read in the Greek-speaking Mediterranean from the 4th through the 7th centuries. The earliest known reference to Diophantus, in the 4th century, is the Commentary on the Almagest Theon of Alexandria, which quotes from the introduction to the Arithmetica. According to the Suda, Hypatia, who was Theon's daughter and frequent collaborator, wrote a now lost commentary on Diophantus' Arithmetica, which suggests that this work may have been closely studied by Neoplatonic mathematicians in Alexandria during Late antiquity. References to Diophantus also survive in a number of Neoplatonic scholia to the works of Iamblichus. A 6th century Neoplatonic commentary on Porphyry's Isagoge by Pseudo-Elias also mentions Diophantus; after outlining the quadrivium of arithmetic, geometry, music, and astronomy and four other disciplines adjacent to them ("logistic", "geodesy", "music in matter" and "spherics"), it mentions that Nicomachus (author of the Introduction to Arithmetic) occupies the first place in arithmetic but Diophantus occupies the first place in "logistic", showing that, despite the title of Arithmetica, the more algebraic work of Diophantus was already seen as distinct from arithmetic prior to the medieval era.

=== Medieval era ===
Like many other Greek mathematical treatises, Diophantus was forgotten in Western Europe during the Dark Ages, since the study of ancient Greek, and literacy in general, had greatly declined. The portion of the Greek Arithmetica that survived, however, was, like all ancient Greek texts transmitted to the early modern world, copied by, and thus known to, medieval Byzantine scholars. Scholia on Diophantus by the Byzantine Greek scholar John Chortasmenos (1370–1437) are preserved together with a comprehensive commentary written by the earlier Greek scholar Maximos Planudes (1260 – 1305), who produced an edition of Diophantus within the library of the Chora Monastery in Byzantine Constantinople.

Arithmetica became known to mathematicians in the Islamic world in the ninth century, when Qusta ibn Luqa translated it into Arabic.

In 1463 German mathematician Regiomontanus wrote: "No one has yet translated from the Greek into Latin the thirteen books of Diophantus, in which the very flower of the whole of arithmetic lies hidden." Arithmetica was first translated from Greek into Latin by Bombelli in 1570, but the translation was never published. However, Bombelli borrowed many of the problems for his own book Algebra. The editio princeps of Arithmetica was published in 1575 by Xylander.

=== Fermat ===
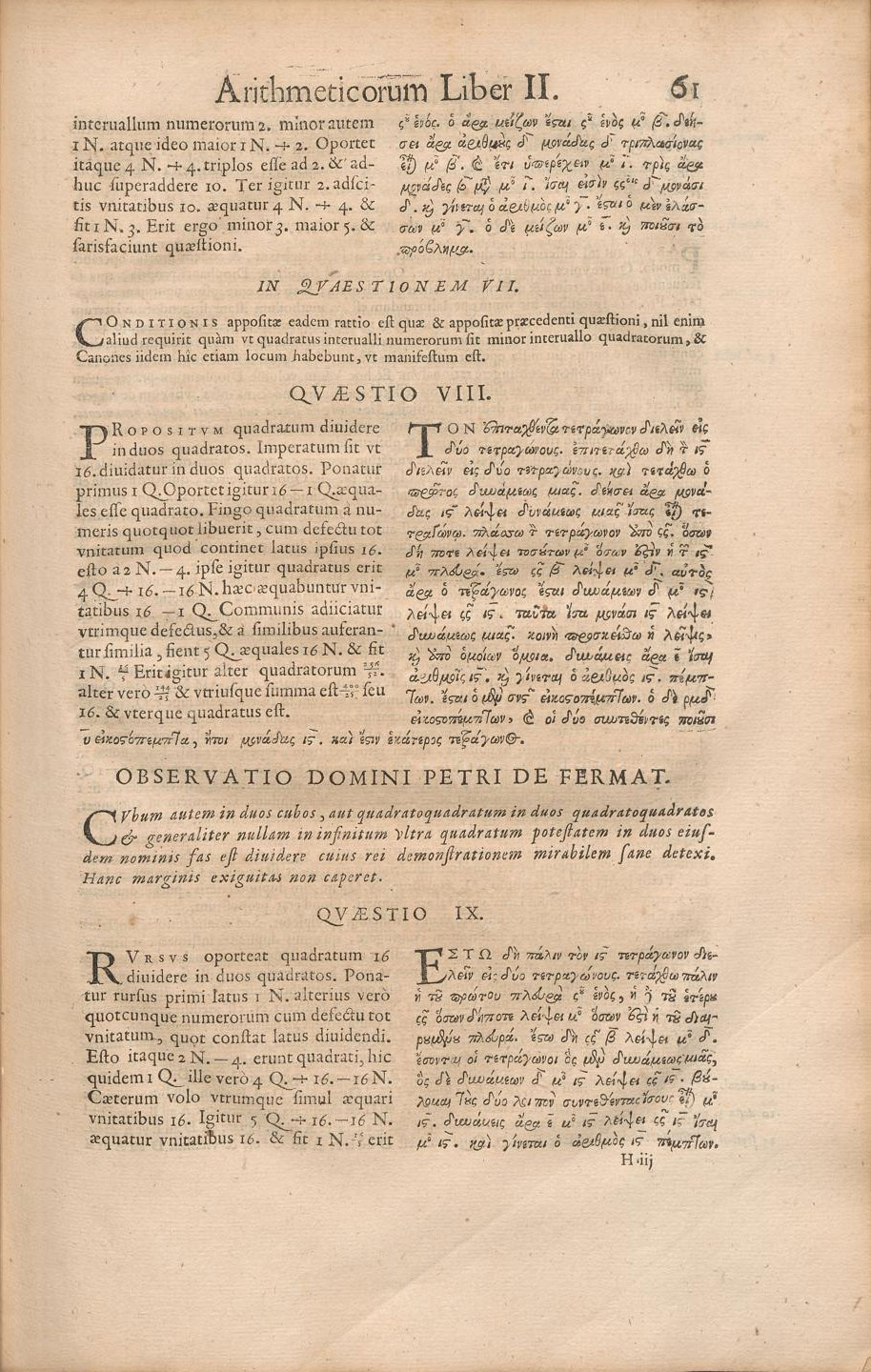
Problem II.8 in the Arithmetica (edition of 1670), annotated with Fermat's comment which became Fermat's Last Theorem.

The Latin translation of Arithmetica by Bachet in 1621 became the first Latin edition that was widely available. Pierre de Fermat owned a copy, studied it and made notes in the margins. The 1621 edition of Arithmetica by Bachet gained fame after Pierre de Fermat wrote his famous "Last Theorem" in the margins of his copy:

If an integer n is greater than 2, then a^{n} + b^{n} = c^{n} has no solutions in non-zero integers a, b, and c. I have a truly marvelous proof of this proposition which this margin is too narrow to contain.

Fermat's proof was never found, and the problem of finding a proof for the theorem went unsolved for centuries. A proof was finally found in 1994 by Andrew Wiles after working on it for seven years. It is believed that Fermat did not actually have the proof he claimed to have. Although the original copy in which Fermat wrote this is lost today, Fermat's son edited the next edition of Diophantus, published in 1670. Even though the text is otherwise inferior to the 1621 edition, Fermat's annotations—including the "Last Theorem"—were printed in this version.

Fermat was not the first mathematician so moved to write in his own marginal notes to Diophantus; the Byzantine scholar John Chortasmenos (1370–1437) had written "Thy soul, Diophantus, be with Satan because of the difficulty of your other theorems and particularly of the present theorem" next to the same problem.

Diophantus was among the first to recognise positive rational numbers as numbers, by allowing fractions for coefficients and solutions. He coined the term παρισότης (parisotēs) to refer to an approximate equality. This term was rendered as adaequalitas in Latin, and became the technique of adequality developed by Pierre de Fermat to find maxima for functions and tangent lines to curves.

=== Diophantine analysis ===
Today, Diophantine analysis is the area of study where integer (whole-number) solutions are sought for equations, and Diophantine equations are polynomial equations with integer coefficients to which only integer solutions are sought. It is usually rather difficult to tell whether a given Diophantine equation is solvable. Most of the problems in Arithmetica lead to quadratic equations. Diophantus looked at 3 different types of quadratic equations: ax^{2} + bx = c, ax^{2} = bx + c, and ax^{2} + c = bx. The reason why there were three cases to Diophantus, while today we have only one case, is that he did not have any notion for zero and he avoided negative coefficients by considering the given numbers a, b, c to all be positive in each of the three cases above. Diophantus was always satisfied with a rational solution and did not require a whole number which means he accepted fractions as solutions to his problems. Diophantus considered negative or irrational square root solutions "useless", "meaningless", and even "absurd". To give one specific example, he calls the equation 4 = 4x + 20 'absurd' because it would lead to a negative value for x. One solution was all he looked for in a quadratic equation. There is no evidence that suggests Diophantus even realized that there could be two solutions to a quadratic equation. He also considered simultaneous quadratic equations.

=== Rediscovery of books IV-VII ===
In 1968, Fuat Sezgin found four previously unknown books of Arithmetica at the shrine of Imam Rezā in Mashhad in northeastern Iran. The four books are thought to have been translated from Greek to Arabic by Qusta ibn Luqa (820–912). Norbert Schappacher has written:

[The four missing books] resurfaced around 1971 in the Astan Quds Library in Meshed (Iran) in a copy from 1198. It was not catalogued under the name of Diophantus (but under that of Qusta ibn Luqa) because the librarian was apparently not able to read the main line of the cover page where Diophantus’s name appears in geometric Kufi calligraphy.

== Editions and translations ==
- Bachet de Méziriac, C.G. Diophanti Alexandrini Arithmeticorum libri sex et De numeris multangulis liber unus. Paris: Lutetiae, 1621.
- Diophantus Alexandrinus, Pierre de Fermat, Claude Gaspard Bachet de Meziriac, Diophanti Alexandrini Arithmeticorum libri 6, et De numeris multangulis liber unus. Cum comm. C(laude) G(aspar) Bacheti et observationibus P(ierre) de Fermat. Acc. doctrinae analyticae inventum novum, coll. ex variis eiu. Tolosae 1670, doi:10.3931/e-rara-9423.
- Tannery, P. L. Diophanti Alexandrini Opera omnia: cum Graecis commentariis, Lipsiae: In aedibus B.G. Teubneri, 1893-1895 (online: vol. 1, vol. 2)
- Sesiano, Jacques. The Arabic text of Books IV to VII of Diophantus’ translation and commentary. Thesis. Providence: Brown University, 1975.
- Sesiano, Jacques (6 December 2012). Books IV to VII of Diophantus’ Arithmetica: in the Arabic Translation Attributed to Qustā ibn Lūqā. Springer Science & Business Media. ISBN 978-1-4613-8174-7.
- Christianidis, Jean; Oaks, Jeffrey A. (2023). The Arithmetica of Diophantus: a complete translation and commentary. Abingdon, Oxon New York, NY: Routledge. ISBN 1138046353.
- Thomas L. Heath (1910). Diophantus of Alexandria: A Study in the History of Greek Algebra (2nd ed.). Cambridge University Press.
