= David Sherry (philosopher) =

American philosopher

David M. Sherry (B.A., University of Montana, 1974; Ph.D., Claremont Graduate School, 1982) is a philosopher and professor at Northern Arizona University in Flagstaff, Arizona. He teaches History of Philosophy, History of Logic, as well as Philosophy of Mathematics. He has published on Logic, Philosophy of Mathematics and Philosophy of Science.

== Selected publications ==
- Kanovei, Vladimir; Katz, Karin U.; Katz, Mikhail; Sherry, David (2015). "Euler's lute and Edwards' oud". The Mathematical Intelligencer. 37 (4): 48–51. arXiv:1506.02586. doi:10.1007/s00283-015-9565-6. S2CID 118393236.
- Katz, Mikhail G.; Sherry, David (2013). "Leibniz's infinitesimals: their fictionality, their modern implementations, and their foes from Berkeley to Russell and beyond". Erkenntnis. 78 (3): 571–625. arXiv:1205.0174. doi:10.1007/s10670-012-9370-y. S2CID 119329569.
- Błaszczyk, Piotr; Katz, Mikhail G.; Sherry, David (2013). "Ten misconceptions from the history of analysis and their debunking". Found. Sci. 18 (1): 43–74. arXiv:1202.4153. doi:10.1007/s10699-012-9285-8. S2CID 119134151.
- Katz, Mikhail G.; Sherry, David M. (2012). "Leibniz's laws of continuity and homogeneity". Notices Amer. Math. Soc. 59 (11): 1550–1558. arXiv:1211.7188. doi:10.1090/noti921. S2CID 42631313.
- Sherry, David (1987). "The wake of Berkeley's Analyst: rigor mathematicae?". Stud. Hist. Philos. Sci. 18 (4): 455–480. Bibcode:1987SHPSA..18..455S. doi:10.1016/0039-3681(87)90003-3.
- Sherry, David (1997). "On mathematical error". Stud. Hist. Philos. Sci. 28 (3): 393–416. Bibcode:1997SHPSA..28..393S. doi:10.1016/S0039-3681(96)00024-6.
