= Smooth infinitesimal analysis =

Modern reformulation of the calculus in terms of infinitesimals

Smooth infinitesimal analysis is a modern reformulation of the calculus in terms of infinitesimals. Based on the ideas of F. W. Lawvere and employing the methods of category theory, it views all functions as being continuous and incapable of being expressed in terms of discrete entities. As a theory, it is a subset of synthetic differential geometry.

The nilsquare or nilpotent infinitesimals are numbers ε where ε² = 0 is true, but ε = 0 need not be true at the same time. Calculus Made Easy notably uses nilpotent infinitesimals.

== Overview ==
This approach departs from the classical logic used in conventional mathematics by denying the law of the excluded middle, e.g., NOT (a ≠ b) does not imply a = b. In particular, in a theory of smooth infinitesimal analysis one can prove for all infinitesimals ε, NOT (ε ≠ 0); yet it is provably false that all infinitesimals are equal to zero. One can see that the law of excluded middle cannot hold from the following basic theorem (again, understood in the context of a theory of smooth infinitesimal analysis):

Every function whose domain is R, the real numbers, is continuous and infinitely differentiable.

Despite this fact, one could attempt to define a discontinuous function f(x) by specifying that f(x) = 1 for x = 0, and f(x) = 0 for x ≠ 0. If the law of the excluded middle held, then this would be a fully defined, discontinuous function. However, there are plenty of x, namely the infinitesimals, such that neither x = 0 nor x ≠ 0 holds, so the function is not defined on the real numbers.

In typical models of smooth infinitesimal analysis, the infinitesimals are not invertible, and therefore the theory does not contain infinite numbers. However, there are also models that include invertible infinitesimals.

Other mathematical systems exist which include infinitesimals, including nonstandard analysis and the surreal numbers. Smooth infinitesimal analysis is like nonstandard analysis in that (1) it is meant to serve as a foundation for analysis, and (2) the infinitesimal quantities do not have concrete sizes (as opposed to the surreals, in which a typical infinitesimal is 1/ω, where ω is a von Neumann ordinal). However, smooth infinitesimal analysis differs from nonstandard analysis in its use of nonclassical logic, and in lacking the transfer principle. Some theorems of standard and nonstandard analysis fail in smooth infinitesimal analysis, including the intermediate value theorem (without modification), and the Banach–Tarski paradox. Statements in nonstandard analysis can be translated into statements about limits, but the same is not always true in smooth infinitesimal analysis.

Intuitively, smooth infinitesimal analysis can be interpreted as describing a world in which lines are made out of infinitesimally small segments, not out of points. These segments can be thought of as being long enough to have a definite direction, but not long enough to be curved. The construction of discontinuous functions fails because a function is identified with a curve, and the curve cannot be constructed pointwise. We can imagine the intermediate value theorem's failure as resulting from the ability of an infinitesimal segment to straddle a line. Similarly, the Banach–Tarski paradox fails because a volume cannot be taken apart into points.

== See also ==
- Category theory
- Nonstandard analysis
- Synthetic differential geometry
- Dual number
