= Indeterminate system =

In mathematics, particularly in number theory, an indeterminate system has fewer equations than unknowns but an additional set of constraints on the unknowns, such as restrictions that the values be integers. In modern times indeterminate equations are often called Diophantine equations.

== Examples ==
=== Linear indeterminate equations ===
An example linear indeterminate equation arises from imagining two equally rich men, one with 5 rubies, 8 sapphires, 7 pearls and 90 gold coins; the other has 7, 9, 6 and 62 gold coins; find the prices (y, c, n) of the respective gems in gold coins. As they are equally rich:
$$5y + 8c + 7n + 90 = 7y + 9c + 6n + 62$$
Bhāskara II gave a general approach to this kind of problem by assigning a fixed integer to one (or N-2 in general) of the unknowns, e.g. $n=1$, resulting a series of possible solutions like (y, c, n)=(14, 1, 1), (13, 3, 1).

For given integers a, b and n, the general linear indeterminate equation is
$$ax + by = n$$
with unknowns x and y restricted to integers. The necessary and sufficient condition for solutions is that the greatest common divisor, $(a,b)$, is divisible by n.

== History ==
Early mathematicians in both India and China studied indeterminate linear equations with integer solutions. Indian astronomer Aryabhata developed a recursive algorithm to solve indeterminate equations now known to be related to Euclid's algorithm. The name of the Chinese remainder theorem relates to the view that indeterminate equations arose in these Asian mathematical traditions, but it is likely that ancient Greeks also worked with indeterminate equations.

The first major work on indeterminate equations appears in Diophantus’ Arithmetica in the 3rd century AD. Diophantus sought solutions constrained to be rational numbers, but Pierre de Fermat's work in the 1600s focused on integer solutions and introduced the idea of characterizing all possible solutions rather than any one solution. In modern times integer solutions to indeterminate equations have come to be called analysis of Diophantine equations.

The original paper Henry John Stephen Smith that defined the Smith normal form was written for linear indeterminate systems.
