= Synthetic differential geometry =

Formalization in mathematical topos theory

In mathematics, synthetic differential geometry is a formalization of the theory of differential geometry in the language of topos theory. There are several insights that allow for such a reformulation. The first is that most of the analytic data for describing the class of smooth manifolds can be encoded into certain fibre bundles on manifolds: namely bundles of jets (see also jet bundle). The second insight is that the operation of assigning a bundle of jets to a smooth manifold is functorial in nature. The third insight is that over a certain category, these are representable functors. Furthermore, their representatives are related to the algebras of dual numbers, so that smooth infinitesimal analysis may be used.

Synthetic differential geometry can serve as a platform for formulating certain otherwise obscure or confusing notions from differential geometry. For example, the meaning of what it means to be natural (or invariant) has a particularly simple expression, even though the formulation in classical differential geometry may be quite difficult.
