= Checkpointing scheme =

Type of algorithm

Checkpointing schemes are scientific computing algorithms used in solving time dependent adjoint equations, as well as reverse mode automatic differentiation.

== Bibliography ==
- Griewank, Andreas (2000). Evaluating Derivatives: Principles and Techniques of Algorithmic Differentiation. Frontiers in Applied Mathematics. Vol. 19. SIAM. ISBN 0-89871-451-6.
