= Outline of calculus =

Overview of and topical guide to calculus

Calculus is a branch of mathematics focused on limits, functions, derivatives, integrals, and infinite series. This subject constitutes a major part of contemporary mathematics education. Calculus has widespread applications in science, economics, and engineering and can solve many problems for which algebra alone is insufficient.

== Branches of calculus ==
- Differential calculus
- Integral calculus
- Multivariable calculus
- Fractional calculus
- Differential Geometry

== History of calculus ==
- History of calculus
- Important publications in calculus

== General calculus concepts ==
- Continuous function
- Derivative
- Fundamental theorem of calculus
- Integral
- Limit
- Non-standard analysis
- Partial derivative
- Infinite Series

== Calculus scholars ==
- Sir Isaac Newton
- Gottfried Leibniz
- Leonhard Euler

== Calculus lists ==
- List of calculus topics

== See also ==
- Glossary of calculus
- Table of mathematical symbols
