= Third derivative =

Rate of change of the second derivative

In calculus, a branch of mathematics, the third derivative or third-order derivative is the rate at which the second derivative, or the rate of change of the rate of change, is changing. The third derivative of a function $y = f(x)$ can be denoted by

$$\frac{d^3y}{dx^3},\quad f'''(x),\quad\text{or }\frac{d^3}{dx^3}[f(x)].$$

Other notations for differentiation can be used, but the above are the most common.

== Mathematical definitions ==
Let $f(x) = x^4$. Then $f'(x) = 4x^3$ and $f''(x) = 12x^2$. Therefore, the third derivative of f is, in this case,

$$f'''(x) = 24x$$

or, using Leibniz notation,

$$\frac{d^3}{dx^3}[x^4] = 24x.$$

Now for a more general definition. Let f be any function of x such that f ′′ is differentiable. Then the third derivative of f is given by

$$\frac{d^3}{dx^3}[f(x)] = \frac{d}{dx}[f''(x)].$$

The third derivative is the rate at which the second derivative (f′′(x)) is changing.

== Applications in geometry ==
In differential geometry, the torsion of a curve—a fundamental property of curves in three dimensions—is computed using third derivatives of coordinate functions (or the position vector) describing the curve.

== Applications in physics ==
In physics, particularly kinematics, jerk is defined as the third derivative of the position function of an object. It is, essentially, the rate at which acceleration changes. In mathematical terms:

$$\mathbf{j}(t)=\frac{d^3\mathbf{r}}{dt^3}$$

where j(t) is the jerk function with respect to time, and r(t) is the position function of the object with respect to time.

== Examples in Economics ==
When campaigning for a second term in office, U.S. President Richard Nixon announced that the rate of increase of inflation was decreasing, which has been noted as "the first time a sitting president used the third derivative to advance his case for reelection." Since inflation is itself a derivative—the rate at which the purchasing power of money decreases—then the rate of increase of inflation is the derivative of inflation, opposite in sign to the second time derivative of the purchasing power of money. Stating that a function is decreasing is equivalent to stating that its derivative is negative, so Nixon's statement is that the second derivative of inflation is decreasing, and so the third derivative of purchasing power is negative.

Since Nixon's statement allowed for the rate of inflation to increase, his statement did not necessarily indicate immediate price stability but proposed a trend of more stability in the future.

== See also ==
- Aberrancy (geometry)
- Derivative (mathematics)
- Second derivative
- Taylor's theorem
