= Differentiable vector-valued functions from Euclidean space =

Differentiable function in functional analysis

In the mathematical discipline of functional analysis, a differentiable vector-valued function from Euclidean space is a differentiable function valued in a topological vector space (TVS) whose domains is a subset of some finite-dimensional Euclidean space. It is possible to generalize the notion of derivative to functions whose domain and codomain are subsets of arbitrary topological vector spaces (TVSs) in multiple ways. But when the domain of a TVS-valued function is a subset of a finite-dimensional Euclidean space then many of these notions become logically equivalent resulting in a much more limited number of generalizations of the derivative and additionally, differentiability is also more well-behaved compared to the general case. This article presents the theory of $k$-times continuously differentiable functions on an open subset $\Omega$ of Euclidean space $\R^n$ ($1 \leq n < \infty$), which is an important special case of differentiation between arbitrary TVSs. This importance stems partially from the fact that every finite-dimensional vector subspace of a Hausdorff topological vector space is TVS isomorphic to Euclidean space $\R^n$ so that, for example, this special case can be applied to any function whose domain is an arbitrary Hausdorff TVS by restricting it to finite-dimensional vector subspaces.

All vector spaces will be assumed to be over the field $\mathbb{F},$ where $\mathbb{F}$ is either the real numbers $\R$ or the complex numbers $\Complex.$

== Continuously differentiable vector-valued functions ==
A map $f,$ which may also be denoted by $f^{(0)},$ between two topological spaces is said to be $0$-times continuously differentiable or $C^0$ if it is continuous. A topological embedding may also be called a $C^0$-embedding.

=== Curves ===
Differentiable curves are an important special case of differentiable vector-valued (i.e. TVS-valued) functions which, in particular, are used in the definition of the Gateaux derivative. They are fundamental to the analysis of maps between two arbitrary topological vector spaces $X \to Y$ and so also to the analysis of TVS-valued maps from Euclidean spaces, which is the focus of this article.

A continuous map $f : I \to X$ from a subset $I \subseteq \mathbb{R}$ that is valued in a topological vector space $X$ is said to be (once or $1$-time) differentiable if for all $t \in I,$ it is differentiable at $t,$ which by definition means the following limit in $X$ exists: $f^{\prime}(t) := f^{(1)}(t) := \lim_{\stackrel{r \to t}{t \neq r \in I}} \frac{f(r) - f(t)}{r - t} = \lim_{\stackrel{h \to 0}{t \neq t + h \in I}} \frac{f(t + h) - f(t)}{h}$ where in order for this limit to even be well-defined, $t$ must be an accumulation point of $I.$ If $f : I \to X$ is differentiable then it is said to be continuously differentiable or $C^1$ if its derivative, which is the induced map $f^{\prime} = f^{(1)} : I \to X,$ is continuous. Using induction on $1 < k \in \N,$ the map $f : I \to X$ is $k$-times continuously differentiable or $C^k$ if its $k-1^{\text{th}}$ derivative $f^{(k-1)} : I \to X$ is continuously differentiable, in which case the $k^{\text{th}}$-derivative of $f$ is the map $f^{(k)} := \left(f^{(k-1)}\right)^{\prime} : I \to X.$ It is called smooth, $C^\infty,$ or infinitely differentiable if it is $k$-times continuously differentiable for every integer $k \in \N.$ For $k \in \N,$ it is called $k$-times differentiable if it is $k-1$-times continuous differentiable and $f^{(k-1)} : I \to X$ is differentiable.

A continuous function $f : I \to X$ from a non-empty and non-degenerate interval $I \subseteq \R$ into a topological space $X$ is called a curve or a $C^0$ curve in $X.$ A path in $X$ is a curve in $X$ whose domain is compact while an arc or C^{0}-arc in $X$ is a path in $X$ that is also a topological embedding. For any $k \in \{ 1, 2, \ldots, \infty \},$ a curve $f : I \to X$ valued in a topological vector space $X$ is called a $C^k$-embedding if it is a topological embedding and a $C^k$ curve such that $f^{\prime}(t) \neq 0$ for every $t \in I,$ where it is called a $C^k$-arc if it is also a path (or equivalently, also a $C^0$-arc) in addition to being a $C^k$-embedding.

=== Differentiability on Euclidean space ===
The definition given above for curves are now extended from functions valued defined on subsets of $\R$ to functions defined on open subsets of finite-dimensional Euclidean spaces.

Throughout, let $\Omega$ be an open subset of $\R^n,$ where $n \geq 1$ is an integer. Suppose $t = \left( t_1, \ldots, t_n \right) \in \Omega$ and $f : \operatorname{domain} f \to Y$ is a function such that $t \in \operatorname{domain} f$ with $t$ an accumulation point of $\operatorname{domain} f.$ Then $f$ is differentiable at $t$ if there exist $n$ vectors $e_1, \ldots, e_n$ in $Y,$ called the partial derivatives of $f$ at $t$, such that $\lim_{\stackrel{p \to t}{t \neq p \in \operatorname{domain} f}} \frac{f(p) - f(t) - \sum_{i=1}^n \left(p_i - t_i \right) e_i}{\|p - t\|_2} = 0 \text{ in } Y$ where $p = \left(p_1, \ldots, p_n\right).$ If $f$ is differentiable at a point then it is continuous at that point. If $f$ is differentiable at every point in some subset $S$ of its domain then $f$ is said to be (once or $1$-time) differentiable in $S$, where if the subset $S$ is not mentioned then this means that it is differentiable at every point in its domain. If $f$ is differentiable and if each of its partial derivatives is a continuous function then $f$ is said to be (once or $1$-time) continuously differentiable or $C^1.$ For $k \in \N,$ having defined what it means for a function $f$ to be $C^k$ (or $k$ times continuously differentiable), say that $f$ is $k + 1$ times continuously differentiable or that $f$ is $C^{k+1}$ if $f$ is continuously differentiable and each of its partial derivatives is $C^k.$ Say that $f$ is $C^{\infty},$ smooth, $C^\infty,$ or infinitely differentiable if $f$ is $C^k$ for all $k = 0, 1, \ldots.$ The support of a function $f$ is the closure (taken in its domain $\operatorname{domain} f$) of the set $\{ x \in \operatorname{domain} f : f(x) \neq 0 \}.$

== Spaces of C^{k} vector-valued functions ==
In this section, the space of smooth test functions and its canonical LF-topology are generalized to functions valued in general complete Hausdorff locally convex topological vector spaces (TVSs). After this task is completed, it is revealed that the topological vector space $C^k(\Omega;Y)$ that was constructed could (up to TVS-isomorphism) have instead been defined simply as the completed injective tensor product $C^k(\Omega) \widehat{\otimes}_{\epsilon} Y$ of the usual space of smooth test functions $C^k(\Omega)$ with $Y.$

Throughout, let $Y$ be a Hausdorff topological vector space (TVS), let $k \in \{ 0, 1, \ldots, \infty \},$ and let $\Omega$ be either:

1. an open subset of $\R^n,$ where $n \geq 1$ is an integer, or else
2. a locally compact topological space, in which case $k$ can only be $0.$

=== Space of C^{k} functions ===
For any $k = 0, 1, \ldots, \infty,$ let $C^k(\Omega;Y)$ denote the vector space of all $C^k$ $Y$-valued maps defined on $\Omega$ and let $C_c^k(\Omega;Y)$ denote the vector subspace of $C^k(\Omega;Y)$ consisting of all maps in $C^k(\Omega;Y)$ that have compact support. Let $C^k(\Omega)$ denote $C^k(\Omega;\mathbb{F})$ and $C_c^k(\Omega)$ denote $C_c^k(\Omega; \mathbb{F}).$ Give $C_c^k(\Omega;Y)$ the topology of uniform convergence of the functions together with their derivatives of order $< k + 1$ on the compact subsets of $\Omega.$ Suppose $\Omega_1 \subseteq \Omega_2 \subseteq \cdots$ is a sequence of relatively compact open subsets of $\Omega$ whose union is $\Omega$ and that satisfy $\overline{\Omega_i} \subseteq \Omega_{i+1}$ for all $i.$ Suppose that $\left(V_\alpha\right)_{\alpha \in A}$ is a basis of neighborhoods of the origin in $Y.$ Then for any integer $\ell < k + 1,$ the sets: $\mathcal{U}_{i, \ell, \alpha} := \left\{ f \in C^k(\Omega;Y) : \left(\partial / \partial p\right)^q f (p) \in U_\alpha \text{ for all } p \in \Omega_i \text{ and all } q \in \mathbb{N}^n, | q | \leq \ell \right\}$ form a basis of neighborhoods of the origin for $C^k(\Omega;Y)$ as $i,$ $\ell,$ and $\alpha \in A$ vary in all possible ways. If $\Omega$ is a countable union of compact subsets and $Y$ is a Fréchet space, then so is $C^(\Omega;Y).$ Note that $\mathcal{U}_{i, l, \alpha}$ is convex whenever $U_{\alpha}$ is convex. If $Y$ is metrizable (resp. complete, locally convex, Hausdorff) then so is $C^k(\Omega;Y).$ If $(p_\alpha)_{\alpha \in A}$ is a basis of continuous seminorms for $Y$ then a basis of continuous seminorms on $C^k(\Omega;Y)$ is: $\mu_{i, l, \alpha}(f) := \sup_{y \in \Omega_i} \left(\sum_{| q | \leq l} p_\alpha\left(\left(\partial / \partial p\right)^q f (p)\right)\right)$ as $i,$ $\ell,$ and $\alpha \in A$ vary in all possible ways.

=== Space of C^{k} functions with support in a compact subset ===
The definition of the topology of the space of test functions is now duplicated and generalized. For any compact subset $K \subseteq \Omega,$ denote the set of all $f$ in $C^k(\Omega;Y)$ whose support lies in $K$ (in particular, if $f \in C^k(K;Y)$ then the domain of $f$ is $\Omega$ rather than $K$) and give it the subspace topology induced by $C^k(\Omega;Y).$ If $K$ is a compact space and $Y$ is a Banach space, then $C^0(K;Y)$ becomes a Banach space normed by $\| f \| := \sup_{\omega \in \Omega} \| f(\omega) \|.$ Let $C^k(K)$ denote $C^k(K;\mathbb{F}).$ For any two compact subsets $K \subseteq L \subseteq \Omega,$ the inclusion $\operatorname{In}_{K}^{L} : C^k(K;Y) \to C^k(L;Y)$ is an embedding of TVSs and that the union of all $C^k(K;Y),$ as $K$ varies over the compact subsets of $\Omega,$ is $C_c^k(\Omega;Y).$

=== Space of compactly support C^{k} functions ===
For any compact subset $K \subseteq \Omega,$ let $\operatorname{In}_K : C^k(K;Y) \to C_c^k(\Omega;Y)$ denote the inclusion map and endow $C_c^k(\Omega;Y)$ with the strongest topology making all $\operatorname{In}_K$ continuous, which is known as the final topology induced by these map. The spaces $C^k(K;Y)$ and maps $\operatorname{In}_{K_1}^{K_2}$ form a direct system (directed by the compact subsets of $\Omega$) whose limit in the category of TVSs is $C_c^k(\Omega;Y)$ together with the injections $\operatorname{In}_{K}.$ The spaces $C^k\left(\overline{\Omega_i}; Y\right)$ and maps $\operatorname{In}_{\overline{\Omega_i}}^{\overline{\Omega_j}}$ also form a direct system (directed by the total order $\mathbb{N}$) whose limit in the category of TVSs is $C_c^k(\Omega;Y)$ together with the injections $\operatorname{In}_{\overline{\Omega_i}}.$ Each embedding $\operatorname{In}_K$ is an embedding of TVSs. A subset $S$ of $C_c^k(\Omega;Y)$ is a neighborhood of the origin in $C_c^k(\Omega;Y)$ if and only if $S \cap C^k(K;Y)$ is a neighborhood of the origin in $C^k(K;Y)$ for every compact $K \subseteq \Omega.$ This direct limit topology (i.e. the final topology) on $C_c^\infty(\Omega)$ is known as the canonical LF topology.

If $Y$ is a Hausdorff locally convex space, $T$ is a TVS, and $u : C_c^k(\Omega;Y) \to T$ is a linear map, then $u$ is continuous if and only if for all compact $K \subseteq \Omega,$ the restriction of $u$ to $C^k(K;Y)$ is continuous. The statement remains true if "all compact $K \subseteq \Omega$" is replaced with "all $K := \overline{\Omega}_i$".

=== Properties ===
Theorem—Let $m$ be a positive integer and let $\Delta$ be an open subset of $\R^m.$ Given $\phi \in C^k(\Omega \times \Delta),$ for any $y \in \Delta$ let $\phi_y : \Omega \to \mathbb{F}$ be defined by $\phi_y(x) = \phi(x, y)$ and let $I_k(\phi) : \Delta \to C^k(\Omega)$ be defined by $I_k(\phi)(y) := \phi_y.$ Then $I_\infty : C^\infty(\Omega \times \Delta) \to C^\infty(\Delta; C^\infty(\Omega))$ is a surjective isomorphism of TVSs. Furthermore, its restriction $I_{\infty}\big\vert_{C_c^{\infty}\left(\Omega \times \Delta\right)} : C_c^\infty(\Omega \times \Delta) \to C_c^\infty\left(\Delta; C_c^\infty(\Omega)\right)$ is an isomorphism of TVSs (where $C_c^\infty\left(\Omega \times \Delta\right)$ has its canonical LF topology).

Theorem—Let $Y$ be a Hausdorff locally convex topological vector space and for every continuous linear form $y^{\prime} \in Y$ and every $f \in C^\infty(\Omega;Y),$ let $J_{y^{\prime}}(f) : \Omega \to \mathbb{F}$ be defined by $J_{y^{\prime}}(f)(p) = y^{\prime}(f(p)).$ Then $J_{y^{\prime}} : C^\infty(\Omega;Y) \to C^\infty(\Omega)$ is a continuous linear map; and furthermore, its restriction $J_{y^{\prime}}\big\vert_{C_c^\infty(\Omega;Y)} : C_c^\infty(\Omega;Y) \to C^\infty(\Omega)$ is also continuous (where $C_c^\infty(\Omega;Y)$ has the canonical LF topology).

=== Identification as a tensor product ===
Suppose henceforth that $Y$ is Hausdorff. Given a function $f \in C^k(\Omega)$ and a vector $y \in Y,$ let $f \otimes y$ denote the map $f \otimes y : \Omega \to Y$ defined by $(f \otimes y)(p) = f(p) y.$ This defines a bilinear map $\otimes : C^k(\Omega) \times Y \to C^k(\Omega;Y)$ into the space of functions whose image is contained in a finite-dimensional vector subspace of $Y;$ this bilinear map turns this subspace into a tensor product of $C^k(\Omega)$ and $Y,$ which we will denote by $C^k(\Omega) \otimes Y.$ Furthermore, if $C_c^k(\Omega) \otimes Y$ denotes the vector subspace of $C^k(\Omega) \otimes Y$ consisting of all functions with compact support, then $C_c^k(\Omega) \otimes Y$ is a tensor product of $C_c^k(\Omega)$ and $Y.$

If $X$ is locally compact then $C_c^{0}(\Omega) \otimes Y$ is dense in $C^0(\Omega;X)$ while if $X$ is an open subset of $\R^{n}$ then $C_c^{\infty}(\Omega) \otimes Y$ is dense in $C^k(\Omega;X).$

Theorem—If $Y$ is a complete Hausdorff locally convex space, then $C^k(\Omega;Y)$ is canonically isomorphic to the injective tensor product $C^k(\Omega) \widehat{\otimes}_{\epsilon} Y.$

== See also ==
- Convenient vector space – locally convex vector spaces satisfying a very mild completeness condition
- Crinkled arc
- Differentiation in Fréchet spaces
- Fréchet derivative – Derivative defined on normed spaces
- Gateaux derivative – Generalization of the concept of directional derivative
- Infinite-dimensional vector function – function whose values lie in an infinite-dimensional vector space
- Injective tensor product
