= Banach manifold =

Manifold modeled on Banach spaces

In mathematics, a Banach manifold is a manifold modeled on Banach spaces. Thus it is a topological space in which each point has a neighbourhood homeomorphic to an open set in a Banach space (a more involved and formal definition is given below). Banach manifolds are one possibility of extending manifolds to infinite dimensions.

A further generalisation is to Fréchet manifolds, replacing Banach spaces by Fréchet spaces. On the other hand, a Hilbert manifold is a special case of a Banach manifold in which the manifold is locally modeled on Hilbert spaces.

== Definition ==
Let $X$ be a set. An atlas of class $C^r,$ $r \geq 0,$ on $X$ is a collection of pairs (called charts) $\left(U_i, \varphi_i\right),$ $i \in I,$ such that

1. each $U_i$ is a subset of $X$ and the union of the $U_i$ is the whole of $X$;
2. each $\varphi_i$ is a bijection from $U_i$ onto an open subset $\varphi_i\left(U_i\right)$ of some Banach space $E_i,$ and for any indices $i \text{ and } j,$ $\varphi_i\left(U_i \cap U_j\right)$ is open in $E_i;$
3. the crossover map
  $$\varphi_j \circ \varphi_i^{-1} : \varphi_i\left(U_i \cap U_j\right) \to \varphi_j\left(U_i \cap U_j\right)$$
  is an $r$-times continuously differentiable function for every $i, j \in I;$ that is, the $r$th Fréchet derivative
  $$\mathrm{d}^r\left(\varphi_j \circ \varphi_i^{-1}\right) : \varphi_i\left(U_i \cap U_j\right) \to \mathrm{Lin}\left(E_i^r; E_j\right)$$
  exists and is a continuous function with respect to the $E_i$-norm topology on subsets of $E_i$ and the operator norm topology on $\operatorname{Lin}\left(E_i^r; E_j\right).$

One can then show that there is a unique topology on $X$ such that each $U_i$ is open and each $\varphi_i$ is a homeomorphism. Very often, this topological space is assumed to be a Hausdorff space, but this is not necessary from the point of view of the formal definition.

If all the Banach spaces $E_i$ are equal to the same space $E,$ the atlas is called an $E$-atlas. However, it is not a priori necessary that the Banach spaces $E_i$ be the same space, or even isomorphic as topological vector spaces. However, if two charts $\left(U_i, \varphi_i\right)$ and $\left(U_j, \varphi_j\right)$ are such that $U_i$ and $U_j$ have a non-empty intersection, a quick examination of the derivative of the crossover map
$$\varphi_j \circ \varphi_i^{-1} : \varphi_i\left(U_i \cap U_j\right) \to \varphi_j\left(U_i \cap U_j\right)$$
shows that $E_i$ and $E_j$ must indeed be isomorphic as topological vector spaces. Furthermore, the set of points $x \in X$ for which there is a chart $\left(U_i, \varphi_i\right)$ with $x$ in $U_i$ and $E_i$ isomorphic to a given Banach space $E$ is both open and closed. Hence, one can without loss of generality assume that, on each connected component of $X,$ the atlas is an $E$-atlas for some fixed $E.$

A new chart $(U, \varphi)$ is called compatible with a given atlas $\left\{\left(U_i, \varphi_i\right) : i \in I\right\}$ if the crossover map
$$\varphi_i \circ \varphi^{-1} : \varphi\left(U \cap U_i\right) \to \varphi_i\left(U \cap U_i\right)$$
is an $r$-times continuously differentiable function for every $i \in I.$ Two atlases are called compatible if every chart in one is compatible with the other atlas. Compatibility defines an equivalence relation on the class of all possible atlases on $X.$

A $C^r$-manifold structure on $X$ is then defined to be a choice of equivalence class of atlases on $X$ of class $C^r.$ If all the Banach spaces $E_i$ are isomorphic as topological vector spaces (which is guaranteed to be the case if $X$ is connected), then an equivalent atlas can be found for which they are all equal to some Banach space $E.$ $X$ is then called an $E$-manifold, or one says that $X$ is modeled on $E.$

== Examples ==
Every Banach space can be canonically identified as a Banach manifold. If $(X, \|\,\cdot\,\|)$ is a Banach space, then $X$ is a Banach manifold with an atlas containing a single, globally defined chart (the identity map).

Similarly, if $U$ is an open subset of some Banach space then $U$ is a Banach manifold. (See the classification theorem below.)

== Classification up to homeomorphism ==
It is by no means true that a finite-dimensional manifold of dimension $n$ is globally homeomorphic to $\Reals^n,$ or even an open subset of $\Reals^n.$ However, in an infinite-dimensional setting, it is possible to classify "well-behaved" Banach manifolds up to homeomorphism quite nicely. A 1969 theorem of David Henderson states that every infinite-dimensional, separable, metric Banach manifold $X$ can be embedded as an open subset of the infinite-dimensional, separable Hilbert space, $H$ (up to linear isomorphism, there is only one such space, usually identified with $\ell^2$). In fact, Henderson's result is stronger: the same conclusion holds for any metric manifold modeled on a separable infinite-dimensional Fréchet space.

The embedding homeomorphism can be used as a global chart for $X.$ Thus, in the infinite-dimensional, separable, metric case, the "only" Banach manifolds are the open subsets of Hilbert space.

== See also ==
- Banach bundle
- Differentiation in Fréchet spaces
- Finsler manifold – Generalization of Riemannian manifolds
- Fréchet manifold
- Global analysis – which uses Banach manifolds and other kinds of infinite-dimensional manifolds
- Hilbert manifold – Manifold modelled on Hilbert spaces
