= Fréchet manifold =

Topological space in mathematics

In mathematics, in particular in nonlinear analysis, a Fréchet manifold is a topological space modeled on a Fréchet space in much the same way as a manifold is modeled on a Euclidean space.

More precisely, a Fréchet manifold consists of a Hausdorff space $X$ with an atlas of coordinate charts over Fréchet spaces whose transitions are smooth mappings. Thus $X$ has an open cover $\left\{ U_{\alpha} \right\}_{\alpha \in I},$ and a collection of homeomorphisms $\phi_{\alpha} : U_{\alpha} \to F_{\alpha}$ onto their images, where $F_{\alpha}$ are Fréchet spaces, such that
$$\phi_{\alpha\beta} := \phi_\alpha \circ \phi_\beta^{-1}|_{\phi_\beta\left(U_\beta\cap U_\alpha\right)}$$
is smooth for all pairs of indices $\alpha, \beta.$

== Classification up to homeomorphism ==
It is by no means true that a finite-dimensional manifold of dimension $n$ is globally homeomorphic to $\R^n$ or even an open subset of $\R^n.$ However, in an infinite-dimensional setting, it is possible to classify "well-behaved" Fréchet manifolds up to homeomorphism quite nicely. A 1969 theorem of David Henderson states that every infinite-dimensional, separable, metric Fréchet manifold $X$ can be embedded as an open subset of the infinite-dimensional, separable Hilbert space, $H$ (up to linear isomorphism, there is only one such space).

The embedding homeomorphism can be used as a global chart for $X.$ Thus, in the infinite-dimensional, separable, metric case, up to homeomorphism, the "only" topological Fréchet manifolds are the open subsets of the separable infinite-dimensional Hilbert space. But in the case of differentiable or smooth Fréchet manifolds (up to the appropriate notion of diffeomorphism) this fails.

== See also ==
- Banach manifold – Manifold modeled on Banach spaces, of which a Fréchet manifold is a generalization
- Manifolds of mappings
- Differentiation in Fréchet spaces
- Hilbert manifold – Manifold modelled on Hilbert spaces
