= Infinite-dimensional holomorphy =

Holomorphic functions in infinite dimensions

In mathematics, infinite-dimensional holomorphy is a branch of functional analysis. It is concerned with generalizations of the concept of holomorphic function to functions defined and taking values in complex Banach spaces (or Fréchet spaces more generally), typically of infinite dimension. It is one aspect of nonlinear functional analysis.

== Vector-valued holomorphic functions defined in the complex plane ==
A first step in extending the theory of holomorphic functions beyond one complex dimension is considering so-called vector-valued holomorphic functions, which are still defined in the complex plane C, but take values in a Banach space. Such functions are important, for example, in constructing the holomorphic functional calculus for bounded linear operators.

Definition. A function f : U → X, where U ⊂ C is an open subset and X is a complex Banach space, is called holomorphic if it is complex-differentiable; that is, for each point z ∈ U the following limit exists:

$$f'(z)=\lim_{\zeta\to z} \frac{f(\zeta)-f(z)}{\zeta - z}.$$

One may define the line integral of a vector-valued holomorphic function f : U → X along a rectifiable curve γ : [a, b] → U in the same way as for complex-valued holomorphic functions, as the limit of sums of the form

$$\sum_{1 \le k \le n} f(\gamma(t_k)) ( \gamma(t_k) - \gamma(t_{k-1}) )$$

where a = t_{0} < t_{1} < ... < t_{n} = b is a subdivision of the interval [a, b], as the lengths of the subdivision intervals approach zero.

It is a quick check that the Cauchy integral theorem also holds for vector-valued holomorphic functions. Indeed, if f : U → X is such a function and T : X → C a bounded linear functional, one can show that

$$T\left(\int_\gamma f(z)\,dz\right)=\int_\gamma (T\circ f)(z)\,dz.$$

Moreover, the composition T o f : U → C is a complex-valued holomorphic function. Therefore, for γ a simple closed curve whose interior is contained in U, the integral on the right is zero, by the classical Cauchy integral theorem. Then, since T is arbitrary, it follows from the Hahn–Banach theorem that

$$\int_\gamma f(z)\,dz=0$$

which proves the Cauchy integral theorem in the vector-valued case.

Using this powerful tool one may then prove Cauchy's integral formula, and, just like in the classical case, that any vector-valued holomorphic function is analytic.

A useful criterion for a function f : U → X to be holomorphic is that T o f : U → C is a holomorphic complex-valued function for every continuous linear functional T : X → C. Such an f is weakly holomorphic. It can be shown that a function defined on an open subset of the complex plane with values in a Fréchet space is holomorphic if, and only if, it is weakly holomorphic.

== Holomorphic functions between Banach spaces ==
More generally, given two complex Banach spaces X and Y and an open set U ⊂ X, f : U → Y is called holomorphic if the Fréchet derivative of f exists at every point in U. One can show that, in this more general context, it is still true that a holomorphic function is analytic, that is, it can be locally expanded in a power series. It is no longer true however that if a function is defined and holomorphic in a ball, its power series around the center of the ball is convergent in the entire ball; for example, there exist holomorphic functions defined on the entire space which have a finite radius of convergence.

== Holomorphic functions between topological vector spaces ==
In general, given two complex topological vector spaces X and Y and an open set U ⊂ X, there are various ways of defining holomorphy of a function f : U → Y. Unlike the finite dimensional setting, when X and Y are infinite dimensional, the properties of holomorphic functions may depend on which definition is chosen. To restrict the number of possibilities we must consider, we shall only discuss holomorphy in the case when X and Y are locally convex.

This section presents a list of definitions, proceeding from the weakest notion to the strongest notion. It concludes with a discussion of some theorems relating these definitions when the spaces X and Y satisfy some additional constraints.

=== Gateaux holomorphy ===
Gateaux holomorphy is the direct generalization of weak holomorphy to the fully infinite dimensional setting.

Let X and Y be locally convex topological vector spaces, and U ⊂ X an open set. A function f : U → Y is said to be Gâteaux holomorphic if, for every a ∈ U and b ∈ X, and every continuous linear functional φ : Y → C, the function

$$f_{\varphi}(z) = \varphi\circ f(a+zb)$$

is a holomorphic function of z in a neighborhood of the origin. The collection of Gâteaux holomorphic functions is denoted by H_{G}(U,Y).

In the analysis of Gateaux holomorphic functions, any properties of finite-dimensional holomorphic functions hold on finite-dimensional subspaces of X. However, as usual in functional analysis, these properties may not piece together uniformly to yield any corresponding properties of these functions on full open sets.

==== Examples ====
- If f ∈ U, then f has Gateaux derivatives of all orders, since for x ∈ U and h_{1}, ..., h_{k} ∈ X, the k-th order Gateaux derivative D^{k}f(x){h_{1}, ..., h_{k}} involves only iterated directional derivatives in the span of the h_{i}, which is a finite-dimensional space. In this case, the iterated Gateaux derivatives are multilinear in the h_{i}, but will in general fail to be continuous when regarded over the whole space X.
- Furthermore, a version of Taylor's theorem holds:

$$f(x+y)=\sum_{n=0}^\infty \frac{1}{n!} \widehat{D}^nf(x)(y)$$

Here, $\widehat{D}^nf(x)(y)$ is the homogeneous polynomial of degree n in y associated with the multilinear operator D^{n}f(x). The convergence of this series is not uniform. More precisely, if V ⊂ X is a fixed finite-dimensional subspace, then the series converges uniformly on sufficiently small compact neighborhoods of 0 ∈ Y. However, if the subspace V is permitted to vary, then the convergence fails: it will in general fail to be uniform with respect to this variation. Note that this is in sharp contrast with the finite dimensional case.

- Hartog's theorem holds for Gateaux holomorphic functions in the following sense:

If f : (U ⊂ X_{1}) × (V ⊂ X_{2}) → Y is a function which is separately Gateaux holomorphic in each of its arguments, then f is Gateaux holomorphic on the product space.

=== Hypoanalyticity ===
A function f : (U ⊂ X) → Y is hypoanalytic if f ∈ H_{G}(U,Y) and in addition f is continuous on relatively compact subsets of U.

=== Holomorphy ===
A function f ∈ H_{G}(U,Y) is holomorphic if, for every x ∈ U, the Taylor series expansion

$$f(x+y)=\sum_{n=0}^\infty \frac{1}{n!} \widehat{D}^nf(x)(y)$$

(which is already guaranteed to exist by Gateaux holomorphy) converges and is continuous for y in a neighborhood of 0 ∈ X. Thus holomorphy combines the notion of weak holomorphy with the convergence of the power series expansion. The collection of holomorphic functions is denoted by H(U,Y).

=== Locally bounded holomorphy ===
A function f : (U ⊂ X) → Y is said to be locally bounded if each point of U has a neighborhood whose image under f is bounded in Y. If, in addition, f is Gateaux holomorphic on U, then f is locally bounded holomorphic. In this case, we write f ∈ H_{LB}(U,Y).
