= Hilbert manifold =

Manifold modelled on Hilbert spaces

In mathematics, a Hilbert manifold is a manifold modeled on Hilbert spaces. Thus it is a separable Hausdorff space in which each point has a neighbourhood homeomorphic to an infinite dimensional Hilbert space. The concept of a Hilbert manifold provides a possibility of extending the theory of manifolds to infinite-dimensional setting. Analogous to the finite-dimensional situation, one can define a differentiable Hilbert manifold by considering a maximal atlas in which the transition maps are differentiable.

== Properties ==
Many basic constructions of manifold theory, such as the tangent space of a manifold and a tubular neighbourhood of a submanifold (of finite codimension), carry over from the finite-dimensional situation to the Hilbert setting with little change. However, in statements involving maps between manifolds one often has to restrict consideration to Fredholm maps, that is, maps whose differential at every point is Fredholm. The reason for this is that Sard's lemma holds for Fredholm maps, but not in general. Notwithstanding this difference, Hilbert manifolds have several very nice properties:

- Kuiper's theorem: If $X$ is a compact topological space or has the homotopy type of a CW complex, then every (real or complex) Hilbert space bundle over $X$ is trivial. In particular, every Hilbert manifold is parallelizable.
- Every smooth Hilbert manifold can be smoothly embedded onto an open subset of the model Hilbert space.
- Every homotopy equivalence between two Hilbert manifolds is homotopic to a diffeomorphism. In particular every two homotopy equivalent Hilbert manifolds are already diffeomorphic. This stands in contrast to lens spaces and exotic spheres, which demonstrate that in the finite-dimensional situation, homotopy equivalence, homeomorphism, and diffeomorphism of manifolds are distinct properties.
- Although Sard’s Theorem does not hold in general, every continuous map $f \colon X \to \R^n$ from a Hilbert manifold can be arbitrarily closely approximated by a smooth map $g \colon X \to \R^n$ that has no critical points.

== Examples ==
- Any Hilbert space $H$ is a Hilbert manifold with a single global chart given by the identity function on $H.$ Moreover, since $H$ is a vector space, the tangent space $\mathrm{T}_p H$ to $H$ at any point $p \in H$ is canonically isomorphic to $H$ itself, and so has a natural inner product, the “same” as the one on $H.$ Thus $H$ can be given the structure of a Riemannian manifold with metric
  $$g(v, w)(p) := \langle v, w \rangle_H \text{ for } v, w \in \mathrm{T}_p H,$$
  where $\langle \cdot, \cdot \rangle_H$ denotes the inner product in $H.$
- Similarly, any open subset of a Hilbert space is a Hilbert manifold and a Riemannian manifold under the same construction as for the whole space.
- There are several mapping spaces between manifolds which can be viewed as Hilbert spaces by only considering maps of suitable Sobolev class. For example we can consider the space $\operatorname{L}(M)$ of all $H^1$ maps from the unit circle $S^1$ into a manifold $M.$ This can be topologized via the compact open topology as a subspace of the space of all continuous mappings from the circle to $M,$ that is, the free loop space of $M.$ The Sobolev kind mapping space $\operatorname{L}(M)$ described above is homotopy equivalent to the free loop space. This makes it suited to the study of algebraic topology of the free loop space, especially in the field of string topology. We can do an analogous Sobolev construction for the loop space, making it a codimension-$d$ Hilbert submanifold of $\operatorname{L}(M),$ where $d$ is the dimension of $M.$

== See also ==
- Banach manifold – Manifold modeled on Banach spaces
- Differentiation in Fréchet spaces
- Finsler manifold – Generalization of Riemannian manifolds
- Fréchet manifold
- Global analysis – which uses Hilbert manifolds and other kinds of infinite-dimensional manifolds
