= Quasi-derivative =

Generalization of a derivative of a function between two Banach spaces

In mathematics, the quasi-derivative is one of several generalizations of the derivative of a function between two Banach spaces. The quasi-derivative is a slightly stronger version of the Gateaux derivative, though weaker than the Fréchet derivative.

Let f : A → F be a continuous function from an open set A in a Banach space E to another Banach space F. Then the quasi-derivative of f at x_{0} ∈ A is a linear transformation u : E → F with the following property: for every continuous function g : [0,1] → A with g(0)=x_{0} such that g′(0) ∈ E exists,

$$\lim_{t\to 0^+}\frac{f(g(t))-f(x_0)}{t} = u(g'(0)).$$

If such a linear map u exists, then f is said to be quasi-differentiable at x_{0}.

Continuity of u need not be assumed, but it follows instead from the definition of the quasi-derivative. If f is Fréchet differentiable at x_{0}, then by the chain rule, f is also quasi-differentiable and its quasi-derivative is equal to its Fréchet derivative at x_{0}. The converse is true provided E is finite-dimensional. Finally, if f is quasi-differentiable, then it is Gateaux differentiable and its Gateaux derivative is equal to its quasi-derivative.
