= Crinkled arc =

In mathematics, and in particular the study of Hilbert spaces, a crinkled arc is a type of continuous curve. The concept is usually credited to Paul Halmos.

Specifically, consider $f\colon [0,1] \to X,$ where $X$ is a Hilbert space with inner product $\langle \cdot, \cdot \rangle.$ We say that $f$ is a crinkled arc if it is continuous and possesses the crinkly property: if $0 \leq a < b\leq c < d \leq 1$ then $\langle f(b)-f(a),f(d)-f(c)\rangle=0,$ that is, the chords $f(b)-f(a)$ and $f(d)-f(c)$ are orthogonal whenever the intervals $[a,b]$ and $[c,d]$ are non-overlapping.

Halmos points out that if two nonoverlapping chords are orthogonal, then "the curve makes a right-angle turn during the passage between the chords' farthest end-points" and observes that such a curve would "seem to be making a sudden right angle turn at each point" which would justify the choice of terminology. Halmos deduces that such a curve could not have a tangent at any point, and uses the concept to justify his statement that an infinite-dimensional Hilbert space is "even roomier than it looks".

Writing in 1975, Richard Vitale considers Halmos's empirical observation that every attempt to construct a crinkled arc results in essentially the same solution and proves that $f(t)$ is a crinkled arc if and only if, after appropriate normalizations, $f(t) = \sqrt{2}\, \sum_{n=1}^{\infty} x_n \frac{\sin(n-1/2)\pi t}{(n - 1/2)\pi}$ where $\left(x_n\right)_n$ is an orthonormal set. The normalizations that need to be allowed are the following: a) Replace the Hilbert space H by its smallest closed subspace containing all the values of the crinkled arc; b) uniform scalings; c) translations; d) reparametrizations. Now use these normalizations to define an equivalence relation on crinkled arcs if any two of them become identical after any sequence of such normalizations. Then there is just one equivalence class, and Vitale's formula describes a canonical example.

== See also ==
- Infinite-dimensional vector function#Crinkled arcs – function whose values lie in an infinite-dimensional vector space
