= Injective tensor product =

In functional analysis, an area of mathematics, the injective tensor product is a particular topological tensor product, a topological vector space (TVS) formed by equipping the tensor product of the underlying vector spaces of two TVSs with a compatible topology. It was introduced by Alexander Grothendieck and used by him to define nuclear spaces. Injective tensor products have applications outside of nuclear spaces: as described below, many constructions of TVSs, and in particular Banach spaces, as spaces of functions or sequences amount to injective tensor products of simpler spaces.

== Definition ==
Let $X$ and $Y$ be locally convex topological vector spaces over $\Complex$, with continuous dual spaces $X^\prime$ and $Y^\prime.$ A subscript $\sigma$ as in $X^\prime_\sigma$ denotes the weak-* topology. Although written in terms of complex TVSs, results described generally also apply to the real case.

The vector space $B\left(X^\prime_\sigma, Y^\prime_\sigma\right)$ of continuous bilinear functionals $X^\prime_\sigma \times Y^\prime_\sigma \to \Complex$ is isomorphic to the (vector space) tensor product $X \otimes Y$, as follows. For each simple tensor $x \otimes y$ in $X \otimes Y$, there is a bilinear map $f\in B\left(X^\prime_\sigma, Y^\prime_\sigma\right)$, given by $f(\varphi,\psi) = \varphi(x)\psi(y)$. It can be shown that the map $x\otimes y\mapsto f$, extended linearly to $X\otimes Y$, is an isomorphism.

Let $X^\prime_b, Y^\prime_b$ denote the respective dual spaces with the topology of bounded convergence. If $Z$ is a locally convex topological vector space, then $B\left(X^\prime_\sigma, Y^\prime_\sigma; Z\right)~\subseteq~ B\left(X^\prime_b, Y^\prime_b; Z\right)$. The topology of the injective tensor product is the topology induced from a certain topology on $B\left(X^\prime_b, Y^\prime_b; Z\right)$, whose basic open sets are constructed as follows. For any equicontinuous subsets $G \subseteq X^\prime$ and $H \subseteq Y^\prime$, and any neighborhood $N$ in $Z$, define
$$\mathcal{U}(G, H, N) = \left\{b \in B\left(X^\prime_b, Y^\prime_b; Z\right) ~:~ b(G\times H) \subseteq N\right\}$$
where every set $b(G \times H)$ is bounded in $Z,$ which is necessary and sufficient for the collection of all $\mathcal{U}(G, H, N)$ to form a locally convex TVS topology on $\mathcal{B}\left(X^\prime_b, Y^\prime_b; Z\right).$ This topology is called the $\varepsilon$-topology or injective topology. In the special case where $Z = \Complex$ is the underlying scalar field, $B\left(X^\prime_\sigma, Y^\prime_\sigma\right)$ is the tensor product $X \otimes Y$ as above, and the topological vector space consisting of $X \otimes Y$ with the $\varepsilon$-topology is denoted by $X \otimes_\varepsilon Y$, and is not necessarily complete; its completion is the injective tensor product of $X$ and $Y$ and denoted by $X \widehat{\otimes}_\varepsilon Y$.

If $X$ and $Y$ are normed spaces then $X\otimes_\varepsilon Y$ is normable. If $X$ and $Y$ are Banach spaces, then $X \widehat{\otimes}_\varepsilon Y$ is also. Its norm can be expressed in terms of the (continuous) duals of $X$ and $Y$. Denoting the unit balls of the dual spaces $X^*$ and $Y^*$ by $B_{X^*}$ and $B_{Y^*}$, the injective norm $\|u\|_\varepsilon$ of an element $u\in X\otimes Y$ is defined as
$$\|u\|_\varepsilon = \sup\big\{\big|\sum_i \varphi(x_i)\psi(y_i)\big| : \varphi\in B_{X^*}, \psi\in B_{Y^*}\big\}$$
where the supremum is taken over all expressions $u = \sum_i x_i\otimes y_i$. Then the completion of $X\otimes Y$ under the injective norm is isomorphic as a topological vector space to $X\widehat{\otimes}_\varepsilon Y$.

== Basic properties ==
The map $(x,y) \mapsto x\otimes y: X\times Y\to X\otimes_\varepsilon Y$ is continuous.

Suppose that $u : X_1 \to Y_1$ and $v : X_2 \to Y_2$ are two linear maps between locally convex spaces. If both $u$ and $v$ are continuous then so is their tensor product $u \otimes v : X_1 \otimes_\varepsilon X_2 \to Y_1 \otimes_\varepsilon Y_2$. Moreover:

- If $u$ and $v$ are both TVS-embeddings then so is $u \widehat{\otimes}_\varepsilon v : X_1 \widehat{\otimes}_\varepsilon X_2 \to Y_1 \widehat{\otimes}_\varepsilon Y_2.$
- If $X_1$ (resp. $Y_1$) is a linear subspace of $X_2$ (resp. $Y_2$) then $X_1 \otimes_\varepsilon Y_1$ is canonically isomorphic to a linear subspace of $X_2 \otimes_\varepsilon Y_2$ and $X_1 \widehat{\otimes}_\varepsilon Y_1$ is canonically isomorphic to a linear subspace of $X_2 \widehat{\otimes}_\varepsilon Y_2.$
- There are examples of $u$ and $v$ such that both $u$ and $v$ are surjective homomorphisms but $u \widehat{\otimes}_\varepsilon v : X_1 \widehat{\otimes}_\varepsilon X_2 \to Y_1 \widehat{\otimes}_\varepsilon Y_2$ is not a homomorphism.
- If all four spaces are normed then $\|u \otimes v\|_\varepsilon = \|u\| \|v\|.$

== Relation to projective tensor product ==
The projective topology or the $\pi$-topology is the finest locally convex topology on $B\left(X^{\prime}_\sigma, Y^{\prime}_\sigma\right) = X \otimes Y$ that makes continuous the canonical map $X \times Y \to X\otimes Y$ defined by sending $(x, y) \in X \times Y$ to the bilinear form $x \otimes y.$ When $X \otimes Y$ is endowed with this topology then it will be denoted by $X \otimes_{\pi} Y$ and called the projective tensor product of $X$ and $Y.$

The injective topology is always coarser than the projective topology, which is in turn coarser than the inductive topology (the finest locally convex TVS topology making $X \times Y \to X \otimes Y$ separately continuous).

The space $X \otimes_\varepsilon Y$ is Hausdorff if and only if both $X$ and $Y$ are Hausdorff. If $X$ and $Y$ are normed then $\|\theta\|_\varepsilon \leq \|\theta\|_{\pi}$ for all $\theta \in X \otimes Y$, where $\|\cdot\|_\pi$ is the projective norm.

The injective and projective topologies both figure in Grothendieck's definition of nuclear spaces.

== Duals of injective tensor products ==
The continuous dual space of $X \otimes_\varepsilon Y$ is a vector subspace of $B(X, Y)$, denoted by $J(X, Y).$ The elements of $J(X, Y)$ are called integral forms on $X \times Y$, a term justified by the following fact.

The dual $J(X, Y)$ of $X \widehat{\otimes}_\varepsilon Y$ consists of exactly those continuous bilinear forms $v$ on $X \times Y$ for which
$$v(x,y) = \int_{S \times T} \varphi(x)\psi(y) \,d\mu(\varphi, \psi)$$
for some closed, equicontinuous subsets $S$ and $T$ of $X^{\prime}_\sigma$ and $Y^{\prime}_\sigma,$ respectively, and some Radon measure $\mu$ on the compact set $S \times T$ with total mass $\leq 1$. In the case where $X,Y$ are Banach spaces, $S$ and $T$ can be taken to be the unit balls $B_{X^*}$ and $B_{Y^*}$.

Furthermore, if $A$ is an equicontinuous subset of $J(X, Y)$ then the elements $v \in A$ can be represented with $S \times T$ fixed and $\mu$ running through a norm bounded subset of the space of Radon measures on $S \times T.$

== Examples ==
For $X$ a Banach space, certain constructions related to $X$ in Banach space theory can be realized as injective tensor products. Let $c_0(X)$ be the space of sequences of elements of $X$ converging to $0$, equipped with the norm $\|(x_i)\| = \sup_i \|x_i\|_X$. Let $\ell_1(X)$ be the space of unconditionally summable sequences in $X$, equipped with the norm
$$\|(x_i)\| = \sup\big\{\sum_{i=1}^\infty |\varphi(x_i)| : \varphi\in B_{X^*}\big\}.$$
Then $c_0(X)$ and $\ell_1(X)$ are Banach spaces, and isometrically $c_0(X) \cong c_0 \widehat{\otimes}_\varepsilon X$ and $\ell_1(X) \cong \ell_1 \widehat{\otimes}_\varepsilon X$ (where $c_0, \,\ell_1$ are the classical sequence spaces). These facts can be generalized to the case where $X$ is a locally convex TVS.

If $H$ and $K$ are compact Hausdorff spaces, then $C(H \times K) \cong C(H) \widehat{\otimes}_\varepsilon C(K)$ as Banach spaces, where $C(X)$ denotes the Banach space of continuous functions on $X$.

=== Spaces of differentiable functions ===
Let $\Omega$ be an open subset of $\R^n$, let $Y$ be a complete, Hausdorff, locally convex topological vector space, and let $C^k(\Omega; Y)$ be the space of $k$-times continuously differentiable $Y$-valued functions. Then $C^k(\Omega; Y) \cong C^k(\Omega) \widehat{\otimes}_\varepsilon Y$.

The Schwartz spaces $\mathcal{L}\left(\R^n\right)$ can also be generalized to TVSs, as follows: let $\mathcal{L}\left(\R^n; Y\right)$ be the space of all $f \in C^{\infty}\left(\R^n; Y\right)$ such that for all pairs of polynomials $P$ and $Q$ in $n$ variables, $\left\{P(x) Q\left(\partial / \partial x\right) f(x) : x \in \R^n\right\}$ is a bounded subset of $Y.$ Topologize $\mathcal{L}\left(\R^n; Y\right)$ with the topology of uniform convergence over $\R^n$ of the functions $P(x) Q\left(\partial / \partial x\right) f(x),$ as $P$ and $Q$ vary over all possible pairs of polynomials in $n$ variables. Then, $\mathcal{L}\left(\R^n; Y\right) \cong \mathcal{L}\left(\R^n\right) \widehat{\otimes}_\varepsilon Y.$
