= Fréchet derivative =

Derivative defined on normed spaces

In mathematics, the Fréchet derivative is a derivative defined on normed spaces. Named after Maurice Fréchet, it is commonly used to generalize the derivative of a real-valued function of a single real variable to the case of a vector-valued function of multiple real variables, and to define the functional derivative used widely in the calculus of variations.

Generally, it extends the idea of the derivative from real-valued functions of one real variable to functions on normed spaces. The Fréchet derivative should be contrasted to the more general Gateaux derivative which is a generalization of the classical directional derivative.

The Fréchet derivative has applications to nonlinear problems throughout mathematical analysis and physical sciences, particularly to the calculus of variations and much of nonlinear analysis and nonlinear functional analysis.

== Definition ==
Let $V$ and $W$ be normed vector spaces, and $U\subseteq V$ be an open subset of $V.$ A function $f : U \to W$ is called Fréchet differentiable at $x \in U$ if there exists a bounded linear operator $A:V\to W$ such that
$$\lim_{\|h\|_{V} \to 0} \frac{\| f(x + h) - f(x) - A(h)\|_W}{\|h\|_V} = 0\text{.}$$

The limit here is meant in the usual sense of a limit of a function defined on a metric space (see Functions on metric spaces), using $V$ and $W$ as the two metric spaces, and the above expression as the function of argument $h$ in $V.$ As a consequence, it must exist for all sequences $\langle h_n\rangle_{n=1}^{\infty}$ of non-zero elements of $V$ that converge to the zero vector $h_n \to 0.$ Equivalently, the first-order expansion holds, in Landau notation
$$f(x + h) = f(x) + A(h) +o(h)\text{.}$$

If there exists such an operator $A,$ it is unique, so we write $Df(x) = A$ and call it the Fréchet derivative of $f$ at $x.$ A function $f$ that is Fréchet differentiable for any point of $U$ is said to be C^{1} if the function
$$Df : U \to B(V,W) ; x \mapsto Df(x)$$
is continuous ($B(V,W)$ denotes the space of all bounded linear operators from $V$ to $W$). Note that this is not the same as requiring that the map $Df(x) : V \to W$ be continuous for each value of $x$ (which is assumed; bounded and continuous are equivalent).

This notion of derivative is a generalization of the ordinary derivative of a function on the real numbers $f : \R \to \R$ since the linear maps from $\R$ to $\R$ are just multiplication by a real number. In this case, $D f(x)$ is the function $h \mapsto f'(x)h$.

== Properties ==
A function differentiable at a point is continuous at that point.

Differentiation is a linear operation in the following sense: if $f$ and $g$ are two maps $V \to W$ which are differentiable at $x,$ and $c$ is a scalar (a real or complex number), then the Fréchet derivative obeys the following properties:
$$D(cf)(x) = cDf(x)$$
$$D(f+g)(x) = Df(x) + Dg(x).$$

The chain rule is also valid in this context: if $f : U \to Y$ is differentiable at $x \in U,$ and $g : Y \to W$ is differentiable at $y = f(x),$ then the composition $g \circ f$ is differentiable at $x$ and the derivative is the composition of the derivatives:

$$D(g \circ f) = (Dg \circ f)\cdot Df$$

== Finite dimensions ==
The Fréchet derivative in finite-dimensional spaces is the usual derivative. In particular, it is represented in coordinates by the Jacobian matrix.

Suppose that $f$ is a map, $f : U \subseteq \R^n \to \R^m$ with $U$ an open set. If $f$ is Fréchet differentiable at a point $a \in U,$ then its derivative is
$$\begin{cases} Df(a) : \R^n \to \R^m \\ Df(a)(v) = J_f(a) v \end{cases}$$
where $J_f(a)$ denotes the Jacobian matrix of $f$ at $a.$

Furthermore, the partial derivatives of $f$ are given by
$$\frac{\partial f}{\partial x_i}(a) = Df(a)(e_i) = J_f(a) e_i,$$
where $\left\{ e_i \right\}$ is the canonical basis of $\R^n.$ Since the derivative is a linear function, we have for all vectors $h \in \R^n$ that the directional derivative of $f$ along $h$ is given by
$$Df(a)(h) = \sum_{i=1}^n h_i \frac{\partial f}{\partial x_i}(a).$$

If all partial derivatives of $f$ exist in $U$ and are continuous at $a$, then $f$ is Fréchet differentiable at $a.$ If the partial derivatives are continuous in all of $U$, then $f$ is Fréchet differentiable and, in fact, C^{1}. The converse is not true; the function
$$f(x, y) = \begin{cases} (x^2+y^2)\sin \left ((x^2+y^2)^{-1/2} \right ) & (x, y) \neq (0, 0)\\ 0 & (x, y) = (0, 0) \end{cases}$$
is Fréchet differentiable, as can be seen with the chain rule, and yet fails to have continuous partial derivatives at $(0, 0).$

== Example in infinite dimensions ==
One of the simplest (nontrivial) examples in infinite dimensions, is the one where the domain is a Hilbert space ($H$) and the function of interest is the norm. So consider $\|\,\cdot\,\| : H \to \R.$

First assume that $x \neq 0.$ Then we claim that the Fréchet derivative of $\|\cdot\|$ at $x$ is the linear functional $D,$ defined by
$$Dv := \left\langle \frac{x}{\|x\|}, v\right\rangle.$$

Indeed,
$$\begin{align}
\frac{|\|x+h\|-\|x\|-Dh|}{\|h\|} &=\frac{|\|x\|\|x+h\|-\langle x,x\rangle-\langle x,h\rangle|}{\|x\|\|h\|} \\[8pt]
&=\frac{|\|x\|\|x+h\|-\langle x,x+h\rangle|}{\|x\|\|h\|} \\[8pt]
&=\frac{|\langle x,x\rangle \langle x+h,x+h\rangle-\langle x,x+h\rangle^2|}{\|x\|\|h\|(|\|x\|\|x+h\|+\langle x,x+h\rangle|)} \\[8pt]
&=\frac{\langle x,x \rangle \langle h,h \rangle-\langle x,h \rangle^2}{\|x\|\|h\|(|\|x\|\|x+h\|+\langle x,x+h\rangle|)} \\
&{}
\end{align}$$

Using continuity of the norm and inner product we obtain:
$$\begin{align}
\lim_{\|h\|\to 0}\frac{|\|x+h\|-\|x\|-Dh|}{\|h\|} &= \lim_{\|h\|\to 0} \frac{\langle x,x \rangle \langle h,h \rangle-\langle x,h \rangle^2}{\|x\|\|h\|(|\|x\|\|x+h\|+\langle x,x+h\rangle|)} \\[8pt]
&= \frac{1}{2\|x\|^3}\lim_{\|h\|\to 0}\frac{\langle x,x \rangle \langle h,h \rangle-\langle x,h \rangle^2}{\|h\|} \\[8pt]
&= \frac{1}{2\|x\|^3}\lim_{\|h\|\to 0}\left(\langle x,x\rangle\|h\|-\langle x,h\rangle \left\langle x,\frac{h}{\|h\|}\right\rangle\right) \\[8pt]
&= \frac{1}{2\|x\|^3}\left(\lim_{\|h\|\to 0}\langle x,x\rangle\|h\|-\lim_{h\to 0}\langle x,h\rangle \left\langle x,\frac{h}{\|h\|}\right\rangle \right ) \\[8pt]
&= \frac{1}{2\|x\|^3}\left(0-\lim_{\|h\|\to 0}\langle x,h\rangle \left\langle x,\frac{h}{\|h\|}\right\rangle \right ) \\[8pt]
&= -\frac{1}{2\|x\|^3}\left(\lim_{\|h\|\to 0}\langle x,h\rangle \left\langle x,\frac{h}{\|h\|}\right\rangle \right ) \\[8pt]
\end{align}$$

As $\|h\|\to 0, \langle x,h\rangle \to 0$ and because of the Cauchy-Schwarz inequality
$$\left\langle x,\frac{h}{\|h\|}\right\rangle$$
is bounded by $\|x\|$ thus the whole limit vanishes.

Now we show that at $x=0$ the norm is not differentiable, that is, there does not exist bounded linear functional $D$ such that the limit in question to be $0.$ Let $D$ be any linear functional. Riesz Representation Theorem tells us that $D$ could be defined by $Dv = \langle a, v\rangle$ for some $a \in H.$ Consider
$$A(h) = \frac{|\|0+h\| - \|0\|-Dh|}{\|h\|} = \left|1-\left\langle a, \frac{h}{\|h\|}\right\rangle\right|.$$

In order for the norm to be differentiable at $0$ we must have
$$\lim_{\|h\|\to 0} A(h) = 0.$$

We will show that this is not true for any $a.$ If $a = 0$ obviously $A(h) = 1$ independently of $h,$ hence this is not the derivative. Assume $a\neq 0.$ If we take $h$ tending to zero in the direction of $-a$ (that is, $h = t\cdot(-a),$ where $t \to 0^+$) then $A(h) = |1+\|a\|| > 1 > 0,$ hence
$$\lim_{\|h\| \to 0} A(h) \neq 0$$

(If we take $h$ tending to zero in the direction of $a$ we would even see this limit does not exist since in this case we will obtain $|1-\|a\||$).

The result just obtained agrees with the results in finite dimensions.

== Relation to the Gateaux derivative ==
A function $f : U \subseteq V \to W$ is called Gateaux differentiable at $x \in U$ if $f$ has a directional derivative along all directions at $x.$ This means that there exists a function $g : V \to W$ such that
$$g(v) = \lim_{t \to 0} \frac{f(x + tv) - f(x)}{t}$$
for any chosen vector $v \in V,$ and where $t$ is from the scalar field associated with $V$ (usually, $t$ is real).

If $f$ is Fréchet differentiable at $x,$ it is also Gateaux differentiable there, and $g$ is just the linear operator $A = D f(x).$

However, not every Gateaux differentiable function is Fréchet differentiable. This is analogous to the fact that the existence of all directional derivatives at a point does not guarantee total differentiability (or even continuity) at that point. For example, the real-valued function $f$ of two real variables defined by
$$f(x, y) = \begin{cases} \frac{x^3}{x^2+y^2} & (x, y) \neq (0, 0)\\ 0 & (x, y) = (0, 0) \end{cases}$$
is continuous and Gateaux differentiable at the origin $(0, 0)$, with its derivative at the origin being
$$g(a, b) = \begin{cases} \frac{a^3}{a^2+b^2}& (a, b) \neq (0, 0)\\ 0 & (a, b) = (0, 0) \end{cases}$$

The function $g$ is not a linear operator, so this function is not Fréchet differentiable.

More generally, any function of the form $f(x, y) = g(r) h(\phi),$ where $r$ and $\phi$ are the polar coordinates of $(x, y),$ is continuous and Gateaux differentiable at $(0, 0)$ if $g$ is differentiable at $0$ and $h(\phi + \pi) = -h(\phi),$ but the Gateaux derivative is only linear and the Fréchet derivative only exists if $h$ is sinusoidal.

In another situation, the function $f$ given by
$$f(x, y) = \begin{cases} \frac{x^3y}{x^6+y^2} & (x, y) \neq (0, 0)\\ 0 & (x, y) = (0, 0) \end{cases}$$
is Gateaux differentiable at $(0, 0),$ with its derivative there being $g(a, b) = 0$ for all $(a, b),$ which is a linear operator. However, $f$ is not continuous at $(0, 0)$ (one can see by approaching the origin along the curve $\left(t, t^3\right)$) and therefore $f$ cannot be Fréchet differentiable at the origin.

A more subtle example is
$$f(x, y) = \begin{cases} \frac{x^2y}{x^4+y^2}\sqrt{x^2+y^2} & (x, y) \neq (0, 0)\\ 0 & (x, y) = (0, 0) \end{cases}$$
which is a continuous function that is Gateaux differentiable at $(0, 0),$ with its derivative at this point being $g(a, b) = 0$ there, which is again linear. However, $f$ is not Fréchet differentiable. If it were, its Fréchet derivative would coincide with its Gateaux derivative, and hence would be the zero operator $A = 0$; hence the limit
$$\lim_{\|h\|_2 \to 0} \frac{|f((0, 0) + h) - f(0, 0) - Ah|}{\|h\|_2} = \lim_{h = (x,y) \to (0,0)} \left|\frac{x^2y}{x^4+y^2}\right|$$
would have to be zero, whereas approaching the origin along the curve $\left(t, t^2\right)$ shows that this limit does not exist.

These cases can occur because the definition of the Gateaux derivative only requires that the difference quotients converge along each direction individually, without making requirements about the rates of convergence for different directions. Thus, for a given ε, although for each direction the difference quotient is within ε of its limit in some neighborhood of the given point, these neighborhoods may be different for different directions, and there may be a sequence of directions for which these neighborhoods become arbitrarily small. If a sequence of points is chosen along these directions, the quotient in the definition of the Fréchet derivative, which considers all directions at once, may not converge. Thus, in order for a linear Gateaux derivative to imply the existence of the Fréchet derivative, the difference quotients have to converge uniformly for all directions.

The following example only works in infinite dimensions. Let $X$ be a Banach space, and $\varphi$ a linear functional on $X$ that is discontinuous at $x = 0$ (a discontinuous linear functional). Let
$$f(x) = \|x\| \varphi(x).$$

Then $f(x)$ is Gateaux differentiable at $x = 0$ with derivative $0.$ However, $f(x)$ is not Fréchet differentiable since the limit
$$\lim_{x \to 0} \varphi(x)$$
does not exist.

== Higher derivatives ==
If $f : U \to W$ is a differentiable function at all points in an open subset $U$ of $V,$ it follows that its derivative
$$D f : U \to L(V, W)$$
is a function from $U$ to the space $L(V, W)$ of all bounded linear operators from $V$ to $W.$ This function may also have a derivative, the second order derivative of $f,$ which, by the definition of derivative, will be a map
$$D^2 f : U \to L(V, L(V, W)).$$

To make it easier to work with second-order derivatives, the space on the right-hand side is identified with the Banach space $L^2(V \times V, W)$ of all continuous bilinear maps from $V$ to $W.$ An element $\varphi$ in $L(V, L(V, W))$ is thus identified with $\psi$ in $L^2(V \times V, W)$ such that for all $x, y \in V,$
$$\varphi(x)(y) = \psi(x, y).$$

(Intuitively: a function $\varphi$ linear in $x$ with $\varphi(x)$ linear in $y$ is the same as a bilinear function $\psi$ in $x$ and $y$.)

One may differentiate
$$D^2 f : U \to L^2(V\times V, W)$$
again, to obtain the third order derivative, which at each point will be a trilinear map, and so on. The $n$-th derivative will be a function
$$D^n f : U \to L^n(V \times V \times \cdots \times V, W),$$
taking values in the Banach space of continuous multilinear maps in $n$ arguments from $V$ to $W.$ Recursively, a function $f$ is $n+1$ times differentiable on $U$ if it is $n$ times differentiable on $U$ and for each $x \in U$ there exists a continuous multilinear map $A$ of $n+1$ arguments such that the limit
$$\lim_{h_{n+1} \to 0} \frac{ \left\| D^nf \left(x + h_{n+1} \right)(h_1, h_2, \ldots, h_n) - D^nf(x)(h_1, h_2, \ldots, h_n) - A \left(h_1, h_2, \ldots, h_n, h_{n+1} \right) \right\| }{\left\|h_{n+1}\right\|} = 0$$
exists uniformly for $h_1, h_2, \ldots, h_n$ in bounded sets in $V.$ In that case, $A$ is the $(n+1)$st derivative of $f$ at $x.$

Moreover, by definition of the tensor product, we may identify a member of the space $L^n\left(V \times V \times \cdots \times V, W\right)$ with a linear map in $L\left(\bigotimes_{j=1}^n V_j, W\right)$ through the identification $f\left(x_1, x_2, \ldots, x_n\right) = f\left(x_1 \otimes x_2 \otimes \cdots \otimes x_n\right),$ thus viewing the derivative as a linear map.

== Partial Fréchet derivatives ==
In this section, we extend the usual notion of partial derivatives, which is defined for functions of the form $f: \R^n \to \R,$ to functions whose domains and target spaces are arbitrary (real or complex) Banach spaces. To do this, let $V_1, \ldots, V_n$ and $W$ be Banach spaces (over the same field of scalars), and let $f : \prod_{i=1}^n V_i \to W$ be a given function, and fix a point $a = \left(a_1, \ldots, a_n\right) \in \prod_{i=1}^n V_i.$ We say that $f$ has an i-th partial differential at the point $a$ if the function $\varphi_i : V_i \to W$ defined by

$$\varphi_i(x) = f(a_1, \ldots, a_{i-1}, x, a_{i+1}, \ldots a_n)$$
is Fréchet differentiable at the point $a_i$ (in the sense described above). In this case, we define $\partial_if(a) := D\varphi_i(a_i),$ and we call $\partial_if(a)$ the i-th partial derivative of $f$ at the point $a.$ $\partial_if(a)$ is a linear transformation from $V_i$ into $W.$ Heuristically, if $f$ has an i-th partial derivative at $a,$ then $\partial_if(a)$ linearly approximates the change in the function $f$ when we fix all of its entries to be $a_j$ for $j \neq i,$ and we only vary the i-th entry. We can express this in the Landau notation as
$$f(a_1, \ldots, a_i+h, \ldots a_n) - f(a_1, \ldots, a_n) = \partial_if(a)(h) + o(h).$$

== Generalization to topological vector spaces ==
The notion of the Fréchet derivative can be generalized to arbitrary topological vector spaces (TVS) $X$ and $Y.$ Letting $U$ be an open subset of $X$ that contains the origin and given a function $f: U \to Y$ such that $f(0) = 0,$ we first define what it means for this function to have 0 as its derivative. We say that this function $f$ is tangent to 0 if for every open neighborhood of 0, $W \subseteq Y$ there exists an open neighborhood of 0, $V\subseteq X$ and a function $o: \R \to \R$ such that
$$\lim_{t\to 0} \frac{o(t)}{t} = 0,$$
and for all $t$ in some neighborhood of the origin, $f(tV) \subseteq o(t) W.$

We can now remove the constraint that $f(0) = 0$ by defining $f$ to be Fréchet differentiable at a point $x_0 \in U$ if there exists a continuous linear operator $\lambda : X \to Y$ such that $f(x_0 + h) - f(x_0) - \lambda h,$ considered as a function of $h,$ is tangent to 0. (Lang p. 6)

If the Fréchet derivative exists then it is unique. Furthermore, the Gateaux derivative must also exist and be equal the Fréchet derivative in that for all $v \in X,$
$$\lim_{\tau \to 0}\frac{f(x_0 + \tau v) - f(x_0)}{\tau} = f'(x_0) v,$$
where $f'(x_0)$ is the Fréchet derivative. A function that is Fréchet differentiable at a point is necessarily continuous there and sums and scalar multiples of Fréchet differentiable functions are differentiable so that the space of functions that are Fréchet differentiable at a point form a subspace of the functions that are continuous at that point. The chain rule also holds as does the Leibniz rule whenever $Y$ is an algebra and a TVS in which multiplication is continuous.

== See also ==
- Directional derivative – Instantaneous rate of change of the function
- Generalizations of the derivative – Fundamental construction of differential calculus
- Gradient#Fréchet derivative – Multivariate derivative (mathematics)
- Infinite-dimensional holomorphy – Holomorphic functions in infinite dimensions
- Infinite-dimensional vector function – Whose values lie in an infinite-dimensional vector space
- Total derivative – Type of derivative in mathematics
