= Convenient vector space =

In mathematics, convenient vector spaces are locally convex vector spaces satisfying a very mild completeness condition.

Traditional differential calculus is effective in the analysis of finite-dimensional vector spaces and for Banach spaces. Beyond Banach spaces, difficulties begin to arise; in particular, composition of continuous linear mappings stop being jointly continuous at the level of Banach spaces, (Note: An example of a composition mapping is the evaluation mapping $\text{ev} : E \times E^* \to \mathbb{R}$, where $E$ is a locally convex vector space, and where $E^*$ is its dual of continuous linear functionals equipped with any locally convex topology such that the evaluation mapping is separately continuous. If the evaluation is assumed to be jointly continuous, then there are neighborhoods $U \subseteq E$ and $V \subseteq E^*$ of zero such that $\text{ev} (U \times V) \subseteq [0, 1]$. However, this means that $U$ is contained in the polar of the open set $V$; so it is bounded in $E$. Thus $E$ admits a bounded neighborhood of zero, and is thus a normed vector space.) for any compatible topology on the spaces of continuous linear mappings.

Mappings between convenient vector spaces are smooth or $C^\infty$ if they map smooth curves to smooth curves. This leads to a Cartesian closed category of smooth mappings between $c^\infty$-open subsets of convenient vector spaces (see property 6 below). The corresponding calculus of smooth mappings is called convenient calculus. It is weaker than any other reasonable notion of differentiability, it is easy to apply, but there are smooth mappings which are not continuous (see Note 1). This type of calculus alone is not useful in solving equations (Note: In order to be useful for solving equations like nonlinear PDEs, convenient calculus has to be supplemented by, for example, a priori estimates which help to create enough Banach space situation to allow convergence of some iteration procedure; for example, see the Nash–Moser theorem, described in terms of convenient calculus in [KM], section 51.).

== The c^{∞}-topology ==
Let $E$ be a locally convex vector space. A curve $c : \R \to E$ is called smooth or $C^\infty$ if all derivatives exist and are continuous. Let $C^\infty(\R, E)$ be the space of smooth curves. It can be shown that the set of smooth curves does not depend entirely on the locally convex topology of $E,$ only on its associated bornology (system of bounded sets); see [KM], 2.11. The final topologies with respect to the following sets of mappings into $E$ coincide; see [KM], 2.13.

- $C^\infty(\R, E).$
- The set of all Lipschitz curves (so that $\left\{ \dfrac{c(t) - c(s)}{t - s} : t \neq s {,} |t|, |s| \leq C \right\}$ is bounded in $E,$ for each $C$).
- The set of injections $E_B \to E$ where $B$ runs through all bounded absolutely convex subsets in $E,$ and where $E_B$ is the linear span of $B$ equipped with the Minkowski functional $\|x\|_B := \inf\{ \lambda > 0 : x \in \lambda B \}.$
- The set of all Mackey convergent sequences $x_n \to x$ (there exists a sequence $0 < \lambda_n \to \infty$ with $\lambda_n\left(x_n - x\right)$ bounded).

This topology is called the $c^\infty$-topology on $E$ and we write $c^\infty E$ for the resulting topological space. In general (on the space $D$ of smooth functions with compact support on the real line, for example) it is finer than the given locally convex topology, it is not a vector space topology, since addition is no longer jointly continuous. Namely, even $c^\infty(D \times D) \neq \left(c^\infty D\right) \times \left(c^\infty D\right).$ The finest among all locally convex topologies on $E$ which are coarser than $c^\infty E$ is the bornologification of the given locally convex topology. If $E$ is a Fréchet space, then $c^\infty E = E.$

== Convenient vector spaces ==
A locally convex vector space $E$ is said to be a convenient vector space if one of the following equivalent conditions holds (called $c^\infty$-completeness); see [KM], 2.14.

- For any $c \in C^\infty(\mathbb{R}, E)$ the (Riemann-) integral $\int_0^1 c(t)\,dt$ exists in $E$.
- Any Lipschitz curve in $E$ is locally Riemann integrable.
- Any scalar wise $C^\infty$ curve is $C^\infty$: A curve $c : \mathbb{R} \to E$ is smooth if and only if the composition $\lambda \circ c : t \mapsto \lambda(c(t))$ is in $C^\infty(\mathbb{R}, \mathbb{R})$ for all $\lambda \in E^*$ where $E^*$ is the dual of all continuous linear functionals on $E$.
  - Equivalently, for all $\lambda \in E'$, the dual of all bounded linear functionals.
  - Equivalently, for all $\lambda \in V$, where $V$ is a subset of $E'$ which recognizes bounded subsets in $E$; see [KM], 5.22.
- Any Mackey-Cauchy-sequence (i.e., $x_n$ such that $t_{n m} (x_n - x_m) \to 0$ for some $t_{n m} \to \infty$ in $\mathbb{R}$) converges in $E$. This is visibly a mild completeness requirement.
- If $B$ is bounded closed absolutely convex, then $E_B$ is a Banach space.
- If $f : \mathbb{R} \to E$ is scalar wise $\text{Lip}^k$, then $f$ is $\text{Lip}^k$, for $k > 1$.
- If $f : \mathbb{R} \to E$ is scalar wise $C^\infty$ then $f$ is differentiable at $0$.

Here a mapping $f : \mathbb{R} \to E$ is called $\text{Lip}^k$ if all derivatives up to order $k$ exist and are Lipschitz, locally on $\mathbb{R}$.

== Smooth mappings ==
Let $E$ and $F$ be convenient vector spaces, and let $U \subseteq E$ be $c^\infty$-open. A mapping $f : U \to F$ is called smooth or $C^\infty$, if the composition $f \circ c \in C^\infty(\mathbb{R}, F)$ for all $c \in C^\infty(\mathbb{R}, U)$. See [KM], 3.11.

== Main properties of smooth calculus ==
1. For maps on Fréchet spaces this notion of smoothness coincides with all other reasonable definitions. On $\mathbb{R}^2$ this is a non-trivial theorem, proved by Boman, 1967. See also [KM], 3.4.

2. Multilinear mappings are smooth if and only if they are bounded ([KM], 5.5).

3. If $f : E \supseteq U \to F$ is smooth then the derivative $df : U \times E \to F$ is smooth, and also $df : U \to L(E, F)$ is smooth where $L(E, F)$ denotes the space of all bounded linear mappings with the topology of uniform convergence on bounded subsets; see [KM], 3.18.

4. The chain rule holds ([KM], 3.18).

5. The space $C^\infty(U, F)$ of all smooth mappings $U \to F$ is again a convenient vector space where the structure is given by the following injection, where $C^\infty(\mathbb{R}, \mathbb{R})$ carries the topology of compact convergence in each derivative separately; see [KM], 3.11 and 3.7.

$$C^\infty(U,F) \to
\prod_{c\in C^\infty(\mathbb R,U), \ell\in F^*}
C^\infty(\mathbb R,\mathbb R),
\quad f\mapsto (\ell\circ f\circ c)_{c,\ell}\,.$$

6. The exponential law holds ([KM], 3.12): For $c^\infty$-open $V \subseteq F$ the following mapping is a linear diffeomorphism of convenient vector spaces.

$$C^\infty(U,C^\infty(V,G)) \cong C^\infty(U\times V, G),\qquad f \mapsto g,\qquad f(u)(v) = g(u,v).$$

This is the main assumption of variational calculus. Here it is a theorem. This property is the source of the name convenient, which was borrowed from (Steenrod 1967).

7. Smooth uniform boundedness theorem ([KM], theorem 5.26). A linear mapping $f : E \to C^\infty(V, G)$ is smooth (by (2) equivalent to bounded) if and only if $\operatorname{ev}_v \circ f : V \to G$ is smooth for each $v \in V$.

8. The following canonical mappings are smooth. This follows from the exponential law by simple categorical reasonings, see [KM], 3.13.

$$\begin{align}
& \operatorname{ev}: C^\infty(E,F)\times E\to F,\quad \text{ev}(f,x) = f(x) \\[6pt]
& \operatorname{ins}: E\to C^\infty(F,E\times F),\quad\text{ins}(x)(y) = (x,y) \\[6pt]
& (\quad)^\wedge :C^\infty(E,C^\infty(F,G))\to C^\infty(E\times F,G) \\[6pt]
& (\quad)^\vee :C^\infty(E\times F,G)\to C^\infty(E,C^\infty(F,G)) \\[6pt]
& \operatorname{comp}:C^\infty(F,G)\times C^\infty(E,F)\to C^\infty(E,G) \\[6pt]
& C^\infty(\quad,\quad):C^\infty(F,F_1)\times C^\infty(E_1,E)\to C^\infty(C^\infty(E,F),C^\infty(E_1,F_1)),\quad (f,g)\mapsto(h\mapsto f\circ h\circ g) \\ [6pt]
& \prod:\prod C^\infty(E_i,F_i)\to C^\infty \left(\prod E_i,\prod F_i\right)
\end{align}$$

== Related convenient calculi ==
Convenient calculus of smooth mappings appeared for the first time in [Frölicher, 1981], [Kriegl 1982, 1983]. Convenient calculus (having properties 6 and 7) exists also for:

- Real analytic mappings (Kriegl, Michor, 1990; see also [KM], chapter II).
- Holomorphic mappings (Kriegl, Nel, 1985; see also [KM], chapter II). The notion of holomorphy is that of [Fantappié, 1930-33].
- Many classes of Denjoy Carleman ultradifferentiable functions, both of Beurling type and of Roumieu-type [Kriegl, Michor, Rainer, 2009, 2011, 2015].
- With some adaptations, $\operatorname{Lip}^k$, [FK].
- With more adaptations, even $C^{k, \alpha}$ (i.e., the $k$-th derivative is Hölder-continuous with index $\alpha$) ([Faure, 1989], [Faure, These Geneve, 1991]).

The corresponding notion of convenient vector space is the same (for their underlying real vector space in the complex case) for all these theories.

== Application: Manifolds of mappings between finite dimensional manifolds ==
The exponential law 6 of convenient calculus allows for very simple proofs of the basic facts about manifolds of mappings. Let $M$ and $N$ be finite dimensional smooth manifolds where $M$ is compact. We use an auxiliary Riemann metric $\bar g$ on $N$. The Riemannian exponential mapping of $\bar g$ is described in the following diagram:

It induces an atlas of charts on the space $C^\infty(M, N)$ of all smooth mappings $M \to N$ as follows. A chart centered at $f \in C^\infty(M, N)$, is:

$$u_f : C^\infty(M,N)\supset U_f =\{g: (f,g)(M)\subset V^{N\times N}\} \to \tilde U_f \subset \Gamma(f^*TN),$$
$$u_f(g) = (\pi_N,\exp^{\bar g})^{-1} \circ (f,g),\quad u_f(g)(x) = (\exp^{\bar g}_{f(x)})^{-1}(g(x)),$$
$$(u_f)^{-1}(s)  = \exp^{\bar g}_f\circ s, \qquad\quad (u_f)^{-1}(s)(x) = \exp^{\bar g}_{f(x)}(s(x)).$$

Now the basics facts follow in easily. Trivializing the pull back vector bundle $f^* T N$ and applying the exponential law 6 leads to the diffeomorphism

$$C^\infty(\mathbb R,\Gamma(M;f^*TN)) = \Gamma(\mathbb R\times M; \operatorname{pr_2}^* f^*TN).$$

All chart change mappings are smooth ($C^\infty$) since they map smooth curves to smooth curves:

$$\tilde U_{f_1}\ni s\mapsto (\pi_N,\exp^{\bar g})\circ s \mapsto (\pi_N,\exp^{\bar g})\circ(f_2,\exp^{\bar g}_{f_1}\circ s).$$

Thus $C^\infty(M, N)$ is a smooth manifold modeled on Fréchet spaces. The space of all smooth curves in this manifold is given by

$$C^\infty(\mathbb R,C^\infty(M,N))\cong C^\infty(\mathbb R\times M,N).$$

Since it visibly maps smooth curves to smooth curves, composition

$$C^\infty(P,M)\times C^\infty(M,N)\to C^\infty(P,N),\qquad (f,g)\mapsto g\circ f,$$

is smooth. As a consequence of the chart structure, the tangent bundle of the manifold of mappings is given by

$$\pi_{C^\infty(M,N)} = C^\infty(M,\pi_N) : TC^\infty(M,N)= C^\infty(M,TN) \to  C^\infty(M,N).$$

=== Regular Lie groups ===
Let $G$ be a connected smooth Lie group modeled on convenient vector spaces, with Lie algebra $\mathfrak g=T_eG$. Multiplication and inversion are denoted by:

$$\mu: G\times G\to G,\quad \mu(x,y) = x.y = \mu_x(y) = \mu^y(x), \qquad \nu: G\to G, \nu(x) = x^{-1}.$$

The notion of a regular Lie group is originally due to Omori et al. for Fréchet Lie groups, was weakened and made more transparent by J. Milnor, and was then carried over to convenient Lie groups; see [KM], 38.4.

A Lie group $G$ is called regular if the following two conditions hold:

- For each smooth curve $X\in C^{\infty}(\mathbb R,\mathfrak g)$ in the Lie algebra there exists a smooth curve $g\in C^{\infty}(\mathbb R,G)$ in the Lie group whose right logarithmic derivative is $X$. It turn out that $g$ is uniquely determined by its initial value $g(0)$, if it exists. That is,

$$g(0) = e, \qquad \partial_t g(t) = T_e(\mu^{g(t)})X(t) = X(t).g(t).$$

If $g$ is the unique solution for the curve $X$ required above, we denote

$$\operatorname{evol}^r_G(X)=g(1), \quad \operatorname{Evol}^r_G(X)(t):= g(t) =\operatorname{evol}^r_G(tX).$$

- The following mapping is required to be smooth:

$$\operatorname{evol}^r_G: C^{\infty}(\mathbb R,\mathfrak g)\to G.$$

If $X$ is a constant curve in the Lie algebra, then $\operatorname{evol}_G^r(X) = \exp^G(X)$ is the group exponential mapping.

Theorem. For each compact manifold $M$, the diffeomorphism group $\operatorname{Diff}(M)$ is a regular Lie group. Its Lie algebra is the space $\mathfrak X(M)$ of all smooth vector fields on $M$, with the negative of the usual bracket as Lie bracket.

Proof: The diffeomorphism group $\operatorname{Diff}(M)$ is a smooth manifold since it is an open subset in $C^\infty(M, M)$. Composition is smooth by restriction. Inversion is smooth: If $t \to f(t, \ )$ is a smooth curve in $\operatorname{Diff}(M)$, then f(t, )^{−1}$f(t, \ )^{-1}(x)$ satisfies the implicit equation $f(t,f(t,\quad)^{-1}(x))=x$, so by the finite dimensional implicit function theorem, $(t, x) \mapsto f(t, \ )^{-1}(x)$ is smooth. So inversion maps smooth curves to smooth curves, and thus inversion is smooth. Let $X(t, x)$ be a time dependent vector field on $M$ (in $C^\infty(\mathbb R,\mathfrak X(M))$). Then the flow operator $\operatorname{Fl}$ of the corresponding autonomous vector field $\partial_t\times X$ on $\mathbb{R} \times M$ induces the evolution operator via

$$\operatorname{Fl}_s(t,x)=(t+s,\operatorname{Evol}(X)(t,x))$$

which satisfies the ordinary differential equation

$$\partial_t\operatorname{Evol}(X)(t,x) = X(t,\operatorname{Evol}(X)(t,x)).$$

Given a smooth curve in the Lie algebra, $X(s,t,x)\in C^\infty(\mathbb R^2,\mathfrak X(M))$, then the solution of the ordinary differential equation depends smoothly also on the further variable $s$, thus $\operatorname{evol}_{\operatorname{Diff}(M)}^r$ maps smooth curves of time dependent vector fields to smooth curves of diffeomorphism. QED.

=== The principal bundle of embeddings ===
For finite dimensional manifolds $M$ and $N$ with $M$ compact, the space $\operatorname{Emb}(M, N)$ of all smooth embeddings of $M$ into $N$, is open in $C^\infty(M, N)$, so it is a smooth manifold. The diffeomorphism group $\operatorname{Diff}(M)$ acts freely and smoothly from the right on $\operatorname{Emb}(M, N)$.

Theorem: $\operatorname{Emb}(M, N) \to \operatorname{Emb}(M, N) / \operatorname{Diff}(M)$ is a principal fiber bundle with structure group $\operatorname{Diff}(M)$.

Proof: One uses again an auxiliary Riemannian metric $\bar g$ on $N$. Given $f \in \operatorname{Emb}(M, N)$, view $f(M)$ as a submanifold of $N$, and split the restriction of the tangent bundle $T N$ to $f(M)$ into the subbundle normal to $f(M)$ and tangential to $f(M)$ as $TN|_{f(M)}= \operatorname{Nor}(f(M))\oplus Tf(M)$. Choose a tubular neighborhood

$$p_{f(M)} : \operatorname{Nor}(f(M))\supset  W_{f(M)} \to f(M).$$

If $g : M \to N$ is $C^1$-near to $f$, then

$$\phi(g):=f^{-1}\circ\, p_{f(M)}\circ\, g\in \operatorname{Diff}(M)\quad \text{and}\quad
g\circ\, \phi(g)^{-1}\in \Gamma(f^*W_{f(M)}) \subset \Gamma(f^*\operatorname{Nor}(f(M))).$$

This is the required local splitting. QED

=== Further applications ===
An overview of applications using geometry of shape spaces and diffeomorphism groups can be found in [Bauer, Bruveris, Michor, 2014].
