= Nonlinear functional analysis =

Branch of mathematical analysis

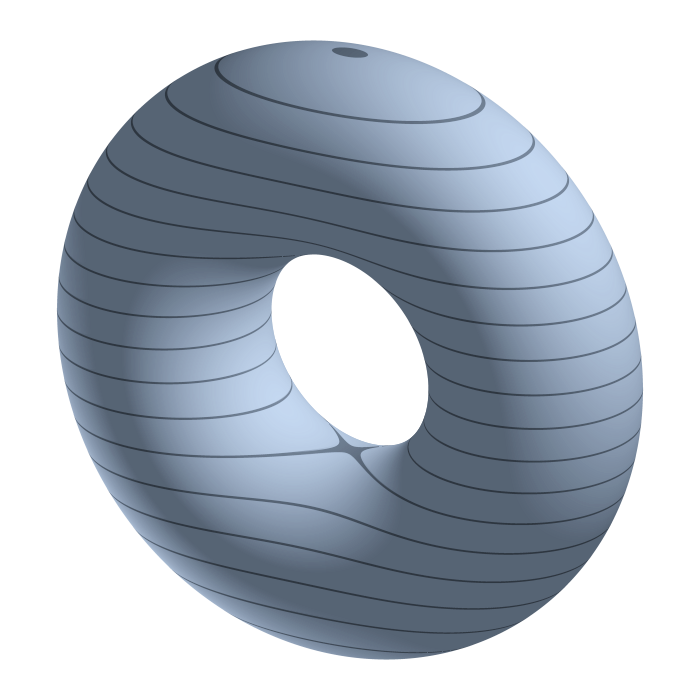
Morse theory is a branch of nonlinear functional analysis.

Nonlinear functional analysis is a branch of mathematical analysis that deals with nonlinear mappings.

== Topics ==
Its subject matter includes:

- generalizations of calculus to Banach spaces
- implicit function theorems
- fixed-point theorems (Brouwer fixed point theorem, Fixed point theorems in infinite-dimensional spaces, topological degree theory, Jordan separation theorem, Lefschetz fixed-point theorem)
- Morse theory and Lusternik–Schnirelmann category theory
- methods of complex function theory

== See also ==
- Functional analysis
