= Infinite-dimensional vector function =

Whose values lie in an infinite-dimensional vector space

An infinite-dimensional vector function is a function whose values lie in an infinite-dimensional topological vector space, such as a Hilbert space or a Banach space.

Such functions are applied in most sciences including physics.

== Example ==
Set $f_k(t) = t/k^2$ for every positive integer $k$ and every real number $t.$ Then the function $f$ defined by the formula
$$f(t) = (f_1(t), f_2(t), f_3(t), \ldots)\, ,$$
takes values that lie in the infinite-dimensional vector space $X$ (or $\R^{\N}$) of real-valued sequences. For example,
$$f(2) = \left(2, \frac{2}{4}, \frac{2}{9}, \frac{2}{16}, \frac{2}{25}, \ldots\right).$$

As a number of different topologies can be defined on the space $X,$ to talk about the derivative of $f,$ it is first necessary to specify a topology on $X$ or the concept of a limit in $X.$

Moreover, for any set $A,$ there exist infinite-dimensional vector spaces having the (Hamel) dimension of the cardinality of $A$ (for example, the space of functions $A \to K$ with finitely-many nonzero elements, where $K$ is the desired field of scalars). Furthermore, the argument $t$ could lie in any set instead of the set of real numbers.

== Integral and derivative ==
Most theorems on integration and differentiation of scalar functions can be generalized to vector-valued functions, often using essentially the same proofs. Perhaps the most important exception is that absolutely continuous functions need not equal the integrals of their (a.e.) derivatives (unless, for example, $X$ is a Hilbert space); see Radon–Nikodym theorem

A curve is a continuous map of the unit interval (or more generally, of a non−degenerate closed interval of real numbers) into a topological space. An arc is a curve that is also a topological embedding. A curve valued in a Hausdorff space is an arc if and only if it is injective.

=== Derivatives ===
If $f : [0,1] \to X,$ where $X$ is a Banach space or another topological vector space then the derivative of $f$ can be defined in the usual way:
$$f'(t) = \lim_{h\to 0}\frac{f(t+h)-f(t)}{h}.$$

==== Functions with values in a Hilbert space ====
If $f$ is a function of real numbers with values in a Hilbert space $X,$ then the derivative of $f$ at a point $t$ can be defined as in the finite-dimensional case:
$$f'(t)=\lim_{h\to 0} \frac{f(t+h)-f(t)}{h}.$$
Most results of the finite-dimensional case also hold in the infinite-dimensional case too, with some modifications. Differentiation can also be defined to functions of several variables (for example, $t \in R^n$ or even $t\in Y,$ where $Y$ is an infinite-dimensional vector space).

If $X$ is a Hilbert space then any derivative (and any other limit) can be computed componentwise: if
$$f = (f_1,f_2,f_3,\ldots)$$
(that is, $f = f_1 e_1+f_2 e_2+f_3 e_3+\cdots,$ where $e_1,e_2,e_3,\ldots$ is an orthonormal basis of the space $X$), and $f'(t)$ exists, then
$$f'(t) = (f_1'(t),f_2'(t),f_3'(t),\ldots).$$
However, the existence of a componentwise derivative does not guarantee the existence of a derivative, as componentwise convergence in a Hilbert space does not guarantee convergence with respect to the actual topology of the Hilbert space.

Most of the above hold for other topological vector spaces $X$ too. However, not as many classical results hold in the Banach space setting, for example, an absolutely continuous function with values in a suitable Banach space need not have a derivative anywhere. Moreover, in most Banach spaces setting there are no orthonormal bases.

=== Crinkled arcs ===
If $[a, b]$ is an interval contained in the domain of a curve $f$ that is valued in a topological vector space then the vector $f(b) - f(a)$ is called the chord of $f$ determined by $[a, b]$. If $[c, d]$ is another interval in its domain then the two chords are said to be non−overlapping chords if $[a, b]$ and $[c, d]$ have at most one end−point in common. Intuitively, two non−overlapping chords of a curve valued in an inner product space are orthogonal vectors if the curve makes a right angle turn somewhere along its path between its starting point and its ending point. If every pair of non−overlapping chords are orthogonal then such a right turn happens at every point of the curve; such a curve can not be differentiable at any point. A crinkled arc is an injective continuous curve with the property that any two non−overlapping chords are orthogonal vectors. An example of a crinkled arc in the Hilbert $L^2$ space $L^2(0, 1)$ is:
$$\begin{alignat}{4}
f :\;&& [0, 1] &&\;\to    \;& L^2(0, 1) \\[0.3ex]
&& t      &&\;\mapsto\;& \mathbb{1}_{[0,t]} \\
\end{alignat}$$
where $\mathbb{1}_{[0,\,t]} : (0, 1) \to \{0, 1\}$ is the indicator function defined by
$$x \;\mapsto\; \begin{cases}1 & \text{ if } x \in [0, t]\\ 0 & \text{ otherwise } \end{cases}$$
A crinkled arc can be found in every infinite−dimensional Hilbert space because any such space contains a closed vector subspace that is isomorphic to $L^2(0, 1).$ A crinkled arc $f : [0, 1] \to X$ is said to be normalized if $f(0) = 0,$ $\|f(1)\| = 1,$ and the span of its image $f([0, 1])$ is a dense subset of $X.$

Proposition—Given any two normalized crinkled arcs in a Hilbert space, each is unitarily equivalent to a reparameterization of the other.

If $h : [0, 1] \to [0, 1]$ is an increasing homeomorphism then $f \circ h$ is called a reparameterization of the curve $f : [0, 1] \to X.$ Two curves $f$ and $g$ in an inner product space $X$ are unitarily equivalent if there exists a unitary operator $L : X \to X$ (which is an isometric linear bijection) such that $g = L \circ f$ (or equivalently, $f = L^{-1} \circ g$).

=== Measurability ===
The measurability of $f$ can be defined by a number of ways, most important of which are Bochner measurability and weak measurability.

=== Integrals ===
The most important integrals of $f$ are called Bochner integral (when $X$ is a Banach space) and Pettis integral (when $X$ is a topological vector space). Both these integrals commute with linear functionals. Also $L^p$ spaces have been defined for such functions.

== See also ==
- Differentiation in Fréchet spaces
- Differentiable vector–valued functions from Euclidean space – Differentiable function in functional analysis
