= Fundamental increment lemma =

In calculus, the fundamental increment lemma is an immediate consequence of the definition of the derivative $f'(a)$ of a function $f$ at a point $a$:
$$f'(a) = \lim_{h \to 0} \frac{f(a+h) - f(a)}{h}.$$
The lemma asserts that the existence of this derivative implies the existence of a function $\varphi$ such that
$$\lim_{h \to 0} \varphi(h) = 0 \qquad \text{and} \qquad f(a+h) = f(a) + f'(a)h + \varphi(h)h$$
for sufficiently small but non-zero $h$. For a proof, it suffices to define
$$\varphi(h) = \frac{f(a+h) - f(a)}{h} - f'(a)$$
and verify this $\varphi$ meets the requirements.

The lemma says, at least when $h$ is sufficiently close to zero, that the difference quotient
$$\frac{f(a+h) - f(a)}{h}$$
can be written as the derivative f' plus an error term $\varphi(h)$ that vanishes at $h=0$.

That is, one has
$$\frac{f(a+h) - f(a)}{h} = f'(a) + \varphi(h).$$

== Differentiability in higher dimensions ==
In that the existence of $\varphi$ uniquely characterises the number $f'(a)$, the fundamental increment lemma can be said to characterise the differentiability of single-variable functions. For this reason, a generalisation of the lemma can be used in the definition of differentiability in multivariable calculus. In particular, suppose f maps some subset of $\mathbb{R}^n$ to $\mathbb{R}$. Then f is said to be differentiable at a if there is a linear function
$$M: \mathbb{R}^n \to \mathbb{R}$$
and a function
$$\Phi: D \to \mathbb{R}, \qquad D \subseteq \mathbb{R}^n \smallsetminus \{ \mathbf{0} \},$$
such that
$$\lim_{\mathbf{h} \to 0} \Phi(\mathbf{h}) = 0 \qquad \text{and} \qquad f(\mathbf{a}+\mathbf{h}) - f(\mathbf{a}) = M(\mathbf{h})  + \Phi(\mathbf{h}) \cdot \Vert\mathbf{h}\Vert$$
for non-zero h sufficiently close to 0. In this case, M is the unique derivative (or total derivative, to distinguish from the directional and partial derivatives) of f at a. Notably, M is given by the Jacobian matrix of f evaluated at a.

We can write the above equation in terms of the partial derivatives $\frac{\partial f}{\partial x_i}$ as
$$f(\mathbf{a} + \mathbf{h}) - f(\mathbf{a}) = \displaystyle\sum_{i=1}^n \frac{\partial f(a)}{\partial x_i}h_i + \Phi(\mathbf{h}) \cdot \Vert\mathbf{h}\Vert$$

== See also ==
- Generalizations of the derivative
