= Strict differentiability =

In mathematics, strict differentiability is a modification of the usual notion of differentiability of functions that is particularly suited to p-adic analysis. In short, the definition is made more restrictive by allowing both points used in the difference quotient to "move".

== Basic definition ==
The simplest setting in which strict differentiability can be considered, is that of a real-valued function defined on an interval I of the real line. The function f:I → R is said strictly differentiable in a point a ∈ I if

$$\lim_{(x,y)\to(a,a)}\frac{f(x)-f(y)}{x-y}$$

exists, where $(x,y)\to(a,a)$ is to be considered as limit in $\mathbb R^2$, and of course requiring $x\ne y$.

A strictly differentiable function is obviously differentiable, but the converse is wrong, as can be seen from the counter-example

$$f(x)=x^2\sin\tfrac{1}{x},\ f(0)=0,~x_n=\tfrac{1}{(n+\frac12)\pi},\ y_n=x_{n+1}.$$

One has however the equivalence of strict differentiability on an interval I, and being of differentiability class $C^1(I)$ (i.e. continuously differentiable).

In analogy with the Fréchet derivative, the previous definition can be generalized to the case where R is replaced by a Banach space E (such as $\mathbb{R}^n$), and requiring existence of a continuous linear map L such that

$$f(x)-f(y)=L(x-y)+\operatorname{o}\limits_{(x,y)\to(a,a)}(|x-y|)$$

where $o(\cdot)$ is defined in a natural way on E × E.

== Motivation from p-adic analysis ==
In the p-adic setting, the usual definition of the derivative fails to have certain desirable properties. For instance, it is possible for a function that is not locally constant to have zero derivative everywhere. An example of this is furnished by the function F: Z_{p} → Z_{p}, where Z_{p} is the ring of p-adic integers, defined by

$$F(x) = \begin{cases}
p^2 & \text{if } x \equiv p \pmod{p^3} \\
p^4 & \text{if } x \equiv p^2 \pmod{p^5} \\
p^6 & \text{if } x \equiv p^3 \pmod{p^7} \\
\vdots & \vdots \\
0 & \text{otherwise}.\end{cases}$$

One checks that the derivative of F, according to the usual definition of the derivative, exists and is zero everywhere, including at x = 0. That is, for any x in Z_{p},

$$\lim_{h \to 0} \frac{F(x+h) - F(x)}{h} = 0.$$

Nevertheless F fails to be locally constant at the origin.

The problem with this function is that the difference quotients

$$\frac{F(y)-F(x)}{y-x}$$

do not approach zero for x and y close to zero. For example, taking x = p^{n} − p^{2n} and y = p^{n}, we have

$$\frac{F(y)-F(x)}{y-x} = \frac{p^{2n} - 0}{p^n-(p^n - p^{2n})} = 1,$$

which does not approach zero. The definition of strict differentiability avoids this problem by imposing a condition directly on the difference quotients.

== Definition in p-adic case ==
Let K be a complete extension of Q_{p} (for example K = C_{p}), and let X be a subset of K with no isolated points. Then a function F : X → K is said to be strictly differentiable at x = a if the limit

$$\lim_{(x,y) \to (a,a)} \frac{F(y)-F(x)}{y-x}$$

exists.
