= Dini derivative =

Class of generalisations of the derivative

In mathematics and, specifically, real analysis, the Dini derivatives (or Dini derivates) are a class of generalizations of the derivative. They were introduced by Ulisse Dini, who studied continuous but nondifferentiable functions.

The upper Dini derivative, which is also called an upper right-hand derivative, of a continuous function

$$f:{\mathbb R} \rightarrow {\mathbb R},$$

is denoted by f and defined by

$$f'_+(t) = \limsup_{h \to {0+}} \frac{f(t + h) - f(t)}{h},$$

where lim sup is the supremum limit and the limit is a one-sided limit. The lower Dini derivative, f, is defined by

$$f'_-(t) = \liminf_{h \to {0+}} \frac{f(t) - f(t - h)}{h},$$

where lim inf is the infimum limit.

If f is defined on a vector space, then the upper Dini derivative at t in the direction d is defined by

$$f'_+ (t,d) = \limsup_{h \to {0+}} \frac{f(t + hd) - f(t)}{h}.$$

If f is locally Lipschitz, then f is finite. If f is differentiable at t, then the Dini derivative at t is the usual derivative at t.

== Remarks ==
- The functions are defined in terms of the infimum and supremum in order to make the Dini derivatives as "bullet proof" as possible, so that the Dini derivatives are well-defined for almost all functions, even for functions that are not conventionally differentiable. The upshot of Dini's analysis is that a function is differentiable at the point t on the real line (ℝ), only if all the Dini derivatives exist, and have the same value.
- Sometimes the notation D^{+} f(t) is used instead of f(t) and D_{−} f(t) is used instead of f(t).
- Also,

$$D^{+}f(t) = \limsup_{h \to {0+}} \frac{f(t + h) - f(t)}{h}$$

and

$$D_{-}f(t) = \liminf_{h \to {0+}} \frac{f(t) - f(t - h)}{h}$$.

- So when using the D notation of the Dini derivatives, the plus or minus sign indicates the left- or right-hand limit, and the placement of the sign indicates the infimum or supremum limit.
- There are two further Dini derivatives, defined to be

$$D_{+}f(t) = \liminf_{h \to {0+}} \frac{f(t + h) - f(t)}{h}$$

and

$$D^{-}f(t) = \limsup_{h \to {0+}} \frac{f(t) - f(t - h)}{h}$$.

which are the same as the first pair, but with the supremum and the infimum reversed. For only moderately ill-behaved functions, the two extra Dini derivatives aren't needed. For particularly badly behaved functions, if all four Dini derivatives have the same value ($D^{+}f(t) = D_{+}f(t) = D^{-}f(t) = D_{-}f(t)$) then the function f is differentiable in the usual sense at the point t .

- On the extended reals, each of the Dini derivatives always exist; however, they may take on the values +∞ or −∞ at times (i.e., the Dini derivatives always exist in the extended sense).

== See also ==
- Denjoy–Young–Saks theorem – Mathematical theorem about Dini derivatives
- Derivative (generalizations) – Fundamental construction of differential calculus
- Semi-differentiability
