= Symmetric derivative =

Operation in differential calculus

In mathematics, the symmetric derivative is an operation generalizing the ordinary derivative.

It is defined as:
$$\lim_{h \to 0} \frac{f(x + h) - f(x - h)}{2h}.$$

The expression under the limit is sometimes called the symmetric difference quotient. A function is said to be symmetrically differentiable at a point x if its symmetric derivative exists at that point.

If a function is differentiable (in the usual sense) at a point, then it is also symmetrically differentiable, but the converse is not true. A well-known counterexample is the absolute value function f(x) = |x|, which is not differentiable at x = 0, but is symmetrically differentiable there with symmetric derivative 0. For differentiable functions, the symmetric difference quotient does provide a better numerical approximation of the derivative than the usual difference quotient.

The symmetric derivative at a given point equals the arithmetic mean of the left and right derivatives at that point, if the latter two both exist.

Neither Rolle's theorem nor the mean-value theorem hold for the symmetric derivative; some similar but weaker statements have been proved.

== Examples ==
=== The absolute value function ===
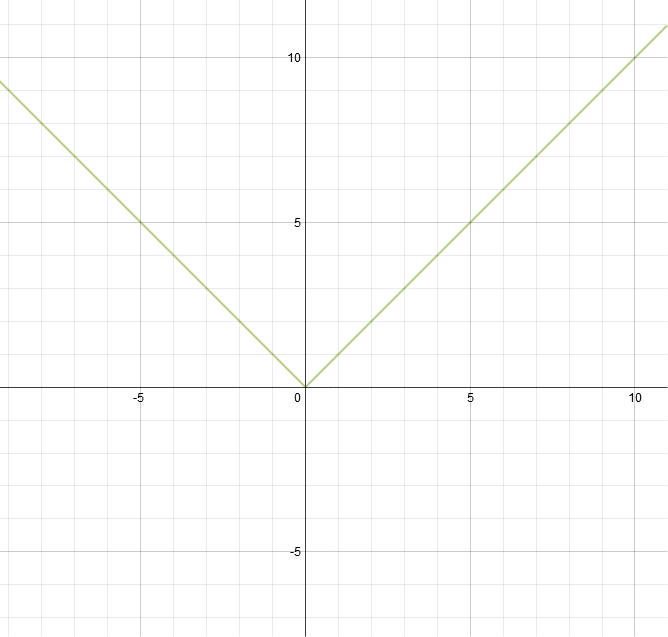
Graph of the absolute value function. Note the sharp turn at x = 0, leading to non-differentiability of the curve at x = 0. The function hence possesses no ordinary derivative at x = 0. The symmetric derivative, however, exists for the function at x = 0.

For the absolute value function $f(x) = |x|$, using the notation $f_s(x)$ for the symmetric derivative, we have at $x = 0$ that
$$\begin{align}
f_s(0)
&= \lim_{h \to 0}\frac{f(0 + h) - f(0 - h)}{2h} = \lim_{h \to 0}\frac{f(h) - f(-h)}{2h} \\
&= \lim_{h \to 0}\frac{|h| - |{-h}|}{2h} \\
&= \lim_{h \to 0}\frac{|h| - |h|}{2h} \\
&= \lim_{h \to 0}\frac{0}{2h} = 0. \\
\end{align}$$

Hence the symmetric derivative of the absolute value function exists at $x = 0$ and is equal to zero, even though its ordinary derivative does not exist at that point (due to a "sharp" turn in the curve at $x = 0$).

Note that in this example both the left and right derivatives at 0 exist, but they are unequal (one is −1, while the other is +1); their average is 0, as expected.

=== The function x^{−2} ===
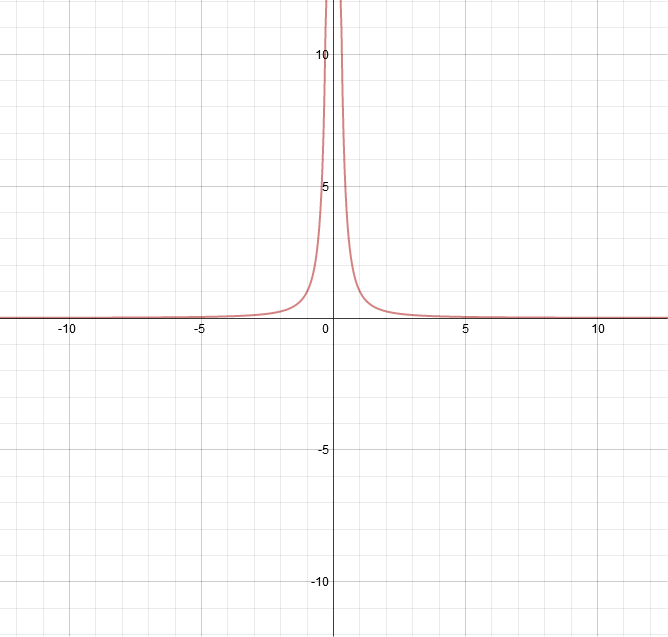
Graph of y = 1/x^{2}. Note the discontinuity at x = 0. The function hence possesses no ordinary derivative at x = 0. The symmetric derivative, however, exists for the function at x = 0.

For the function $f(x) = 1/x^2$, at $x = 0$ we have
$$\begin{align}
f_s(0)
&= \lim_{h \to 0}\frac{f(0 + h) - f(0 - h)}{2h}
= \lim_{h \to 0}\frac{f(h) - f(-h)}{2h} \\[1ex]
&= \lim_{h \to 0}\frac{1/h^2 - 1/(-h)^2}{2h}
= \lim_{h \to 0}\frac{1/h^2 - 1/h^2}{2h}
= \lim_{h \to 0}\frac{0}{2h} = 0.
\end{align}$$

Again, for this function the symmetric derivative exists at $x = 0$, while its ordinary derivative does not exist at $x = 0$ due to discontinuity in the curve there. Furthermore, neither the left nor the right derivative is finite at 0, i.e. this is an essential discontinuity.

=== The Dirichlet function ===
The Dirichlet function, defined as:
$$f(x) = \begin{cases}
1, & \text{if }x\text{ is rational} \\
0, & \text{if }x\text{ is irrational}
\end{cases}$$
has a symmetric derivative at every $x \in \Q$, but is not symmetrically differentiable at any $x \in \R \setminus \Q$; i.e. the symmetric derivative exists at rational numbers but not at irrational numbers.

== Quasi-mean-value theorem ==
The symmetric derivative does not obey the usual mean-value theorem (of Lagrange). As a counterexample, the symmetric derivative of f(x) = |x| has the image {−1, 0, 1}, but secants for f can have a wider range of slopes; for instance, on the interval [−1, 2], the mean-value theorem would mandate that there exist a point where the (symmetric) derivative takes the value $\frac{|2| - |-1|}{2 - (-1)} = \frac{1}{3}$.

A theorem somewhat analogous to Rolle's theorem but for the symmetric derivative was established in 1967 by C. E. Aull, who named it quasi-Rolle theorem. If f is continuous on the closed interval [a, b] and symmetrically differentiable on the open interval (a, b), and f(a) = f(b) = 0, then there exist two points x, y in (a, b) such that f_{s}(x) ≥ 0, and f_{s}(y) ≤ 0. A lemma also established by Aull as a stepping stone to this theorem states that if f is continuous on the closed interval [a, b] and symmetrically differentiable on the open interval (a, b), and additionally f(b) > f(a), then there exist a point z in (a, b) where the symmetric derivative is non-negative, or with the notation used above, f_{s}(z) ≥ 0. Analogously, if f(b) < f(a), then there exists a point z in (a, b) where f_{s}(z) ≤ 0.

The quasi-mean-value theorem for a symmetrically differentiable function states that if f is continuous on the closed interval [a, b] and symmetrically differentiable on the open interval (a, b), then there exist x, y in (a, b) such that

$$f_s(x) \leq \frac{f(b) - f(a)}{b - a} \leq f_s(y).$$

As an application, the quasi-mean-value theorem for f(x) = |x| on an interval containing 0 predicts that the slope of any secant of f is between −1 and 1.

If the symmetric derivative of f has the Darboux property, then the (form of the) regular mean-value theorem (of Lagrange) holds, i.e. there exists z in (a, b) such that
$$f_s(z) = \frac{f(b) - f(a)}{b - a}.$$

As a consequence, if a function is continuous and its symmetric derivative is also continuous (thus has the Darboux property), then the function is differentiable in the usual sense.

== Generalizations ==
The notion generalizes to higher-order symmetric derivatives and also to n-dimensional Euclidean spaces.

=== The second symmetric derivative ===
The second symmetric derivative is defined as
$$\lim_{h \to 0} \frac{f(x + h) - 2f(x) + f(x - h)}{h^2}.$$

If the (usual) second derivative exists, then the second symmetric derivative exists and is equal to it. The second symmetric derivative may exist, however, even when the (ordinary) second derivative does not. As example, consider the sign function $\sgn(x)$, which is defined by
$$\sgn(x) = \begin{cases}
-1 & \text{if } x < 0, \\
0 & \text{if } x = 0, \\
1 & \text{if } x > 0.
\end{cases}$$

The sign function is not continuous at zero, and therefore the second derivative for $x = 0$ does not exist. But the second symmetric derivative exists for $x = 0$:
$$\lim_{h \to 0} \frac{\sgn(0 + h) - 2\sgn(0) + \sgn(0 - h)}{h^2} = \lim_{h \to 0} \frac{\sgn(h) - 2\cdot 0 + (-\sgn(h))}{h^2} = \lim_{h \to 0} \frac{0}{h^2} = 0.$$

== See also ==
- Central differencing scheme
- Density point
- Five-point stencil
- Generalizations of the derivative
- Symmetrically continuous function
