= List of medical abbreviations: 0–9 =

Dx - Diagnosis, Sx - Symptoms, Fx - Fracture, Tx - Treatment, Hx - History S/b-seen by

Sortable table
Abbreviation	Meaning
Δ	diagnosis change
ΔΔ	differential diagnosis (the list of possible diagnoses, and the effort to narrow that list)
+ve	positive (as in the result of a test)
#	fracture
#NOF	fracture to the neck of the femur
℞	(R with crossed tail) prescription
Ψ	psychiatry, psychosis
Σ	sigmoidoscopy
x/12	x number of months
x/40	x number of weeks of pregnancy
x/52	x number of weeks
x/7	x number of days
18F-FDG	18F-fluordeoxyglucose
2°	secondary
2/2	secondary to
3TC	lamivudine
5-FU	5-fluorouracil
5-HIAA	5-hydroxyindoleacetic acid
5-HT	5-hydroxytryptamine, that is, serotonin
6MP	6-mercaptopurine
↑	increased
↓	decreased
→	yields, becomes
