= Semiderivative =

Semiderivative or Semi-derivative may refer to:

- One-sided derivative of semi-differentiable functions
- Half-derivative, an operator $H$ that when acting twice on a function $f$ gives the derivative of $f$.
