= Symmetrically continuous function =

In mathematics, a function $f: \mathbb{R} \to \mathbb{R}$ is symmetrically continuous at a point x if
$$\lim_{h\to 0} f(x+h)-f(x-h) = 0.$$

The usual definition of continuity implies symmetric continuity, but the converse is not true. For example, the function $x^{-2}$ is symmetrically continuous at $x=0$, but not continuous.

Also, symmetric differentiability implies symmetric continuity, but the converse is not true just like usual continuity does not imply differentiability.

The set of the symmetrically continuous functions, with the usual scalar multiplication can be easily shown to have the structure of a vector space over $\mathbb{R}$, similarly to the usually continuous functions, which form a linear subspace within it.
