= Differentiable function =

Mathematical function whose derivative exists

A differentiable function

In mathematical analysis, a real or complex function of a single variable is differentiable if its derivative exists at each point in its domain. For real-valued functions of a real variable, the graph of a differentiable function has a non-vertical tangent line at each interior point in its domain. A differentiable function is locally approximable by a linear function at each interior point, and does not contain any break, angle, or cusp.

If $x_{0}$ is an interior point in the domain of a real function $f$, then $f$ is said to be differentiable at $x_{0}$ if there exists an $L\in\R$ such that for all $\epsilon>0$, there exists a $\delta>0$ such that for all $x\in(x_{0}-\delta,x_{0})\cup(x_{0},x_{0}+\delta)$,
$$\frac{f(x)-f(x_{0})}{x-x_{0}}\in(L-\epsilon,L+\epsilon).$$
In other words, the graph of $f$ has a non-vertical tangent line at the point $(x_{0},f(x_{0}))$. The function $f$ is said to be differentiable on a subset $U\subseteq\R$ if it is differentiable at every point in $U$, and $f$ is said to be continuously differentiable if its derivative is also a continuous function over the domain of $f$.

Continuous functions may be nowhere differentiable in their domain, such as the Weierstrass function. Taking successive antiderivatives of such a function allows one to obtain a function that is differentiable only a finite number of times, the finite number being any positive integer. Given a positive integer $k$, $f$ is said to be of class $C^k$ if its first $k$ derivatives $f^{\prime}, f^{\prime\prime}, \ldots, f^{(k)}$ exist and are continuous over the domain of $f$.

For a multivariable function, as shown here, the differentiability of it is something more complex than the existence of the partial derivatives of it. However, the idea is fundamentally the same: a function that is locally approximable by a linear map at a particular point is said to be differentiable at that point.

== Differentiability of real functions of one variable ==
A function $f:U\to\mathbb{R}$, defined on an open set $U\subset\mathbb{R}$, is said to be differentiable at $a\in U$ if the derivative
$$f'(a)=\lim_{h\to0}\frac{f(a+h)-f(a)}{h}=\lim_{x\to a}\frac{f(x)-f(a)}{x-a}$$
exists. This implies that the function is continuous at a.

This function f is said to be differentiable on U if it is differentiable at every point of U. In this case, the derivative of f is thus a function from U into $\mathbb R.$

A continuous function is not necessarily differentiable, but a differentiable function is necessarily continuous (at every point where it is differentiable) as is shown below (in the section Differentiability and continuity). A function is said to be continuously differentiable if its derivative is also a continuous function; there exist functions that are differentiable but not continuously differentiable (an example is given in the section Differentiability classes).

=== Semi-differentiability ===
The above definition can be extended to define the derivative at boundary points of the domain that also belong to the domain. The derivative of a function $f:A\to \mathbb{R}$ defined on a closed subset $A\subsetneq \mathbb{R}$ of the real numbers, evaluated at a boundary point $c$, can be defined as the following one-sided limit, where the argument $x$ approaches $c$ such that it is always within $A$:
$$f'(c)=\lim_{{\scriptstyle x\to c\atop\scriptstyle x\in A}}\frac{f(x)-f(c)}{x-c}.$$

For $x$ to remain within $A$, which is a subset of the reals, it follows that this limit will be defined as either
$$f'(c)=\lim_{x\to c^+}\frac{f(x)-f(c)}{x-c} \quad \text{or} \quad f'(c)=\lim_{x\to c^-}\frac{f(x)-f(c)}{x-c}.$$

== Differentiability and continuity ==
The absolute value function is continuous (i.e. it has no gaps). It is differentiable everywhere except at the point x = 0, where it makes a sharp turn as it crosses the y-axis.

A cusp on the graph of a continuous function. At zero, the function is continuous but not differentiable.

If f is differentiable at a point x_{0}, then f must also be continuous at x_{0}. In particular, any differentiable function must be continuous at every point in its domain. The converse does not hold: a continuous function need not be differentiable. For example, a function with a bend, cusp, or vertical tangent may be continuous, but fails to be differentiable at the location of the anomaly.

Most functions that occur in practice have derivatives at all points or at almost every point. However, a result of Stefan Banach states that the set of functions that have a derivative at some point is a meagre set in the space of all continuous functions. Informally, this means that differentiable functions are very atypical among continuous functions. The first known example of a function that is continuous everywhere but differentiable nowhere is the Weierstrass function.

== Differentiability classes ==
Differentiable functions can be locally approximated by linear functions.

The function $f : \R \to \R$ with f(x) = x^{2} sin(1/x) for x ≠ 0 and f(0) = 0 is differentiable. However, this function is not continuously differentiable.

A function $f$ is said to be continuously differentiable if the derivative $f^{\prime}(x)$ exists and is itself a continuous function. Although the derivative of a differentiable function never has a jump discontinuity, it is possible for the derivative to have an essential discontinuity. For example, the function
$$f(x) \;=\; \begin{cases} x^2 \sin(1/x) & \text{ if }x \neq 0 \\ 0 & \text{ if } x = 0\end{cases}$$
is differentiable at 0, since
$$f'(0) = \lim_{\varepsilon \to 0} \left(\frac{\varepsilon^2\sin(1/\varepsilon)-0}{\varepsilon}\right) = 0$$
exists. However, for $x \neq 0,$ differentiation rules imply
$$f'(x) = 2x\sin(1/x) - \cos(1/x)\;,$$
which has no limit as $x \to 0.$ Thus, this example shows the existence of a function that is differentiable but not continuously differentiable (i.e., the derivative is not a continuous function). Nevertheless, Darboux's theorem implies that the derivative of any function satisfies the conclusion of the intermediate value theorem.

Similarly to how continuous functions are said to be of class $C^0,$ continuously differentiable functions are sometimes said to be of class $C^1$. A function is of class $C^2$ if the first and second derivative of the function both exist and are continuous. More generally, a function is said to be of class $C^k$ if the first $k$ derivatives $f^{\prime}(x), f^{\prime\prime}(x), \ldots, f^{(k)}(x)$ all exist and are continuous. If derivatives $f^{(n)}$ exist for all positive integers $n,$ the function is smooth or equivalently, of class $C^{\infty}.$

== Differentiability in higher dimensions ==
A function of several real variables f: R^{m} → R^{n} is said to be differentiable at a point x_{0} if there exists a linear map M: R^{m} → R^{n} (Note: For $m = n = 1$, $\mathbf{M}$ is the 1-dimensional linear scalar function $\mathbb{f}_x \mathbb{h}$, where $\mathbb{f}_x$ is the derivative of $\mathbf{f}$ at $\mathbf{x_0}$. This linear function represents the tangent line to $\mathbf{f}$ at $\mathbf{x_0}$. For $m = 2$ and $n = 1$, $\mathbf{M}$ is the 2-dimensional linear scalar function $\mathbb{f}_x \mathbb{h}_x + \mathbb{f}_y \mathbb{h}_y$ where $\mathbb{f}_x$ and $\mathbb{f}_y$ are partial derivatives of $\mathbf{f}$ at $\mathbf{x_0}$. This linear function represents the tangent plane to $\mathbf{f}$ at $\mathbf{x_0}$. All that mean is that a function is said to be differentiable at a point of its domain if the function is (at least approximately) flat near the point, i.e., the function can be (at least approximately) expressed as a linear map.) such that
$$\lim_{\mathbf{h}\to \mathbf{0}} \frac{\|\mathbf{f}(\mathbf{x_0}+\mathbf{h}) - \mathbf{f}(\mathbf{x_0}) - \mathbf{M}\mathbf{(h)}\|_{\mathbf{R}^{n}}}{\| \mathbf{h} \|_{\mathbf{R}^{m}}} = 0,$$
where ||v|| for a vector v is the norm of it. If a function is differentiable at x_{0}, then all of the partial derivatives exist at x_{0}, and the linear map M is given by J_{f} ⋅ h, where J_{f}, the Jacobian matrix for f evaluated at x_{0} (an n × m matrix in this case), is left-multiplied to a vector h in R^{m}. A similar formulation of the higher-dimensional derivative is provided by the fundamental increment lemma.

If all the partial derivatives of a function exist in a neighborhood of a point x_{0} and are continuous at the point x_{0} (Note: Each partial derivative is continuous at this point over the domain of the function, not just continuous along a certain direction.), then the function is differentiable at that point x_{0}; (Note: For a two-dimensional scalar function, the proof is found in "Theorem 8, Appendix F "Proofs of Theorems", Calculus, 8th, James Stewart, Cengage learning, 2015", and this proof seems to be extendable to higher dimensional scalar functions.) The existence of the partial derivatives (or even of all the directional derivatives) does not guarantee that a function is differentiable at a point. For example, the function f: R^{2} → R defined by
$$f(x,y) = \begin{cases}x & \text{if }y \ne x^2 \\ 0 & \text{if }y = x^2\end{cases}$$
is not differentiable at (0, 0) while all of the partial derivatives and directional derivatives exist at this point. For a continuous example, the function
$$f(x,y) = \begin{cases}y^3/(x^2+y^2) & \text{if }(x,y) \ne (0,0) \\ 0 & \text{if }(x,y) = (0,0)\end{cases}$$
is not differentiable at (0, 0), while again, all of the partial derivatives and directional derivatives exist.

== Differentiability in complex analysis ==
In complex analysis, complex-differentiability is defined using the same definition as single-variable real functions. This is allowed because a complex number (typically expressed as $z = x + iy$) can be divided by a complex number. So, a function $f:\mathbb{C}\to\mathbb{C}$ is said to be differentiable at $x=a$ when
$$f'(a)=\lim_{\underset{h\in\mathbb C}{h\to 0}}\frac{f(a+h)-f(a)}{h}.$$

This limit exists only if the limit is same regardless of a choice of direction of approaching to $a$. Although this definition looks similar to the differentiability of single-variable real functions, it is a more restrictive condition. A function $f:\mathbb{C}\to\mathbb{C}$ that is complex-differentiable at a point $x=a$ is automatically differentiable at that point when viewed as a function $f:\mathbb{R}^2\to\mathbb{R}^2$. (Note: Any complex number $z = x + iy$ can be obtained by a linear combination of the standard basis of $\{1,i\}$ with real scalars $x$ and $y$, meaning that the set of complex numbers can be seen as a 2-dimensional real vector space. With a given basis, a complex number can also be expressed as a tuple $(x,y)$, so the complex numbers can be also seen as the 2-dimensional real vector space $\mathbb{R}^2$, the Cartesian product of two real spaces, with the basis of $\{(1,0),(0,1)\}$.) This is because complex differentiability implies
$$\lim_{\underset{h\in\mathbb C}{h\to 0}}\frac{\|f(a+h)-f(a)-f'(a)h\|}{\|h\|} =
\lim_{\underset{h\in\mathbb C}{h\to 0}}\frac{|f(a+h)-f(a)-f'(a)h|}{|h|}
= 0,$$
where $f'(a)h$ is a linear map $\mathbf{M}(\mathbf{h})$ as in the definition of the differentiability of higher dimensional spaces above, and the absolute-value norm is used. However, a function $f:\mathbb{C}\to\mathbb{C}$ that is differentiable as a multi-variable function may not be complex-differentiable, since not every linear map $\mathbb{R}^2\to\mathbb{R}^2$ is expressible as multiplication by a complex number.

For example, the complex function $f(z)=\frac{z+\overline{z}}{2}$ corresponds to the 2-variable real function $f(x,y)=x$, which is differentiable at every point. This function is not complex-differentiable at any point, since the limit
$$f'(z)=\lim_{\underset{h\in\mathbb C}{h\to 0}}\frac{f(z+h)-f(z)}{h} = \lim_{\underset{h\in\mathbb C}{h\to 0}}\frac{h+\bar h}{2h}$$
is different depending on the path of $h$. A path $h = x$ along the real axis gives $f'(z)= \lim_{x \to 0} \frac{2x}{2x} = 1$, while a path $h = iy$ along the imaginary axis gives $f'(z)= \lim_{y \to 0} \frac{0}{2iy} = 0$.

A function that is complex-differentiable in a neighborhood of a point is called holomorphic at that point. Such a function is necessarily analytic at that point. Conversely, any function that is analytic at a point is also holomorphic at that point.

== Differentiable functions on manifolds ==
If M is a differentiable manifold, a real or complex-valued function f on M is said to be differentiable at a point p if it is differentiable with respect to some (or any) coordinate chart defined around p. If M and N are differentiable manifolds, a function f: M → N is said to be differentiable at a point p if it is differentiable with respect to some (or any) coordinate charts defined around p and f(p).

== See also ==
- Generalizations of the derivative
- Semi-differentiability
- Differentiable programming
- Smoothness
