= Hyperreal =

Hyperreal may refer to:

- Hyperreal numbers, an extension of the real numbers in mathematics that are used in non-standard analysis
- Hyperreal.org, a rave culture website based in San Francisco, US
- Hyperreality, a term used in semiotics and postmodern philosophy
- Hyperrealism (visual arts), a school of painting
- Hyperreal (The Shamen song), 1990
- Hyperreal (Flume song)", 2017
- "Hyperreal", a song by My Ticket Home
- "Hyper Real", a song by Negativland from Dispepsi

== See also ==
- Hypernumber
- Superreal number
