= Monad (nonstandard analysis) =

Named set of points in nonstandard analysis

In nonstandard analysis, a monad or also a halo is the set of points infinitesimally close to a given point.

Given a hyperreal number x in R^{∗}, the monad of x is the set

$$\text{monad}(x)=\{y\in \mathbb{R}^* \mid x-y \text{ is infinitesimal}\}.$$

If x is finite (limited), the unique real number in the monad of x is called the standard part of x.
