= Microcontinuity =

Mathematical term

In nonstandard analysis, a discipline within classical mathematics, microcontinuity (or S-continuity) of an internal function f at a point a is defined as follows:

for all x infinitely close to a, the value f(x) is infinitely close to f(a).

Here x runs through the domain of f. In formulas, this can be expressed as follows:

if $x\approx a$ then $f(x)\approx f(a)$.

For a function f defined on $\mathbb{R}$, the definition can be expressed in terms of the halo as follows: f is microcontinuous at $c\in\mathbb{R}$ if and only if $f(hal(c))\subseteq hal(f(c))$, where the natural extension of f to the hyperreals is still denoted f. Alternatively, the property of microcontinuity at c can be expressed by stating that the composition $\text{st}\circ f$ is constant on the halo of c, where "st" is the standard part function.

== History ==
The modern property of continuity of a function was first defined by Bolzano in 1817. However, Bolzano's work was not noticed by the larger mathematical community until its rediscovery in Heine in the 1860s. Meanwhile, Cauchy's textbook Cours d'Analyse defined continuity in 1821 using infinitesimals as above.

== Continuity and uniform continuity ==
The property of microcontinuity is typically applied to the natural extension f* of a real function f. Thus, f defined on a real interval I is continuous if and only if f* is microcontinuous at every point of I. Meanwhile, f is uniformly continuous on I if and only if f* is microcontinuous at every point (standard and nonstandard) of the natural extension I* of its domain I (see Davis, 1977, p. 96).

== Example 1 ==
The real function $f(x)=\tfrac{1}{x}$ on the open interval (0,1) is not uniformly continuous because the natural extension f* of f fails to be microcontinuous at an infinitesimal $a>0$. Indeed, for such an a, the values a and 2a are infinitely close, but the values of f*, namely $\tfrac{1}{a}$ and $\tfrac{1}{2a}$ are not infinitely close.

== Example 2 ==
The function $f(x)=x^2$ on $\mathbb{R}$ is not uniformly continuous because f* fails to be microcontinuous at an infinite point $H\in \mathbb{R}^*$. Namely, setting $e=\tfrac{1}{H}$ and K = H + e, one easily sees that H and K are infinitely close but f*(H) and f*(K) are not infinitely close.

== Uniform convergence ==
Uniform convergence similarly admits a simplified definition in a hyperreal setting. Thus, a sequence $f_n$ converges to f uniformly if for all x in the domain of f* and all infinite n, $f_n^*(x)$ is infinitely close to $f^*(x)$.

== See also ==
- Standard part function

== Bibliography ==
- Martin Davis (1977) Applied nonstandard analysis. Pure and Applied Mathematics. Wiley-Interscience [John Wiley & Sons], New York-London-Sydney. xii+181 pp. ISBN 0-471-19897-8
- Gordon, E. I.; Kusraev, A. G.; Kutateladze, S. S.: Infinitesimal analysis. Updated and revised translation of the 2001 Russian original. Translated by Kutateladze. Mathematics and its Applications, 544. Kluwer Academic Publishers, Dordrecht, 2002.
