= Overspill =

Proof technique in nonstandard analysis

In nonstandard analysis, a branch of mathematics, overspill (referred to as overflow by Goldblatt (1998, p. 129)) is a widely used proof technique. It is based on the fact that the set of standard natural numbers N is not an internal subset of the internal set *N of hypernatural numbers.

== Statement ==
Overspill principle—Consider a first-order theory $T$ of Peano arithmetic and an induction principle, optionally restricted to a subset $\Sigma$. Let $\varphi \in \Sigma$ be such a formula with one free parameter.

Let $\mathcal M$ be a model of $T$ containing nonstandard integers. Suppose that $\mathcal M \models \varphi(0), \mathcal M \models \varphi(S0), \dots$, then $\mathcal M$ contains a nonstandard $c \in \mathcal M$, such that $\mathcal M \models \varphi(c)$.

Proof

Assume not, then $\{c \in \mathcal M : \mathcal M \models \varphi(c)\}$ is its initial segment containing just the standard natural numbers. But then $\mathcal M \models \varphi(0)$, and $\mathcal M \models \forall n(\varphi(n) \to \varphi(Sn))$, which by the restricted induction principle, implies $\mathcal M \models \forall n,\varphi(n)$, contradiction!

== Examples ==
The overspill principle has a number of useful consequences:

- The set of standard hyperreals is not internal.
- The set of bounded hyperreals is not internal.
- The set of infinitesimal hyperreals is not internal.

In particular:

- If an internal set contains all infinitesimal non-negative hyperreals, it contains a positive non-infinitesimal (or appreciable) hyperreal.
- If an internal set contains N it contains an unlimited (infinite) element of *N.

=== S-continuity ===
These facts can be used to prove the equivalence of the following two conditions for an internal hyperreal-valued function ƒ defined on *R.

$$\forall  \varepsilon\in \mathbb{R}^+,  \exists \delta \in\mathbb{R}^+, |h| \leq \delta \implies |f(x+h) - f(x)| \leq \varepsilon$$

and

$$\forall  h \cong 0,  \ |f(x+h) - f(x)| \cong 0$$

The proof that the second fact implies the first uses overspill, since given a non-infinitesimal positive ε,

$$\forall \mbox{ positive } \delta \cong 0, \ (|h| \leq \delta \implies |f(x+h) - f(x)| < \varepsilon).$$

Applying overspill, we obtain a positive appreciable δ with the requisite properties.

These equivalent conditions express the property known in nonstandard analysis as S-continuity (or microcontinuity) of ƒ at x. S-continuity is referred to as an external property. The first definition is external because it involves quantification over standard values only. The second definition is external because it involves the external relation of being infinitesimal.
