= Standard part function =

Function from the limited hyperreal to the real numbers

In nonstandard analysis, the standard part function is a function from the limited (finite) hyperreal numbers to the real numbers. Briefly, the standard part function "rounds off" a finite hyperreal to the nearest real. It associates to every such hyperreal $x$, the unique real $x_0$ infinitely close to it, i.e. $x-x_0$ is infinitesimal. As such, it is a mathematical implementation of the historical concept of adequality introduced by Pierre de Fermat, as well as Leibniz's transcendental law of homogeneity.

The standard part function was first defined by Abraham Robinson who used the notation ${}^{\circ}x$ for the standard part of a hyperreal $x$ (see Robinson 1974). This concept plays a key role in defining the concepts of the calculus, such as continuity, the derivative, and the integral, in nonstandard analysis. The latter theory is a rigorous formalization of calculations with infinitesimals. The standard part of x is sometimes referred to as its shadow.

== Definition ==
The standard part function "rounds off" a finite hyperreal to the nearest real number. The "infinitesimal microscope" is used to view an infinitesimal neighborhood of a standard real.

Nonstandard analysis deals primarily with the pair $\R \subseteq {}^*\R$, where the hyperreals ${}^*\R$ are an ordered field extension of the reals $\R$, and contain infinitesimals, in addition to the reals. In the hyperreal line every real number has a collection of numbers (called a monad, or halo) of hyperreals infinitely close to it. The standard part function associates to a finite hyperreal x, the unique standard real number x_{0} that is infinitely close to it. The relationship is expressed symbolically by writing

$$\operatorname{st}(x) = x_0.$$

The standard part of any infinitesimal is 0. Thus if N is an infinite hypernatural, then 1/N is infinitesimal, and st(1/N) = 0.

If a hyperreal $u$ is represented by a Cauchy sequence $\langle u_n:n\in\mathbb{N} \rangle$ in the ultrapower construction, then
$$\operatorname{st}(u) = \lim_{n\to\infty} u_n.$$
More generally, each finite $u \in {}^*\R$ defines a Dedekind cut on the subset $\R\subseteq{}^*\R$ (via the total order on ${}^{\ast}\R$) and the corresponding real number is the standard part of u.

== Not internal ==
The standard part function "st" is not defined by an internal set. There are several ways of explaining this. Perhaps the simplest is that its domain L, which is the collection of limited (i.e. finite) hyperreals, is not an internal set. Namely, since L is bounded (by any infinite hypernatural, for instance), L would have to have a least upper bound if L were internal, but L doesn't have a least upper bound. Alternatively, the range of "st" is $\R\subseteq {}^*\R$, which is not internal; in fact every internal set in ${}^*\R$ that is a subset of $\R$ is necessarily finite.

== Applications ==
All the traditional notions of calculus can be expressed in terms of the standard part function, as follows.

=== Derivative ===
The standard part function is used to define the derivative of a function f. If f is a real function, and h is infinitesimal, and if f′(x) exists, then
$$f'(x) = \operatorname{st}\left(\frac {f(x+h)-f(x)}h\right).$$
Alternatively, if $y=f(x)$, one takes an infinitesimal increment $\Delta x$, and computes the corresponding $\Delta y=f(x+\Delta x)-f(x)$. One forms the ratio $\frac{\Delta y}{\Delta x}$. The derivative is then defined as the standard part of the ratio:
$$\frac{dy}{dx}=\operatorname{st}\left( \frac{\Delta y}{\Delta x} \right) .$$

=== Integral ===
Given a function $f$ on $[a,b]$, one defines the integral $\int_a^b f(x)\,dx$ as the standard part of an infinite Riemann sum $S(f,a,b,\Delta x)$ when the value of $\Delta x$ is taken to be infinitesimal, exploiting a hyperfinite partition of the interval [a,b].

=== Limit ===
Given a sequence $(u_n)$, its limit is defined by $\lim_{n\to\infty} u_n = \operatorname{st}(u_H)$ where $H \in {}^*\N \setminus \N$ is an infinite index. Here the limit is said to exist if the standard part is the same regardless of the infinite index chosen.

=== Continuity ===
A real function $f$ is continuous at a real point $x$ if and only if the composition $\operatorname{st}\circ f$ is constant on the halo of $x$. See microcontinuity for more details.

== See also ==
- Adequality
- Nonstandard calculus
