= Superreal number =

Class of extensions of the real numbers

In abstract algebra, the superreal numbers are a class of extensions of the real numbers, introduced by H. Garth Dales and W. Hugh Woodin as a generalization of the hyperreal numbers and primarily of interest in non-standard analysis, model theory, and the study of Banach algebras. The field of superreals is itself a subfield of the surreal numbers.

Dales and Woodin's superreals are distinct from the super-real numbers of David O. Tall, which are lexicographically ordered fractions of formal power series over the reals.

== Formal definition ==
Suppose X is a Tychonoff space and C(X) is the algebra of continuous real-valued functions on X. Suppose P is a prime ideal in C(X). Then the factor algebra A = C(X)/P is by definition an integral domain that is a real algebra and that can be seen to be totally ordered. The field of fractions F of A is a superreal field if F strictly contains the real numbers $\R$, so that F is not order isomorphic to $\R$.

If the prime ideal P is a maximal ideal, then F is a field of hyperreal numbers (Robinson's hyperreals being a very special case).

== Bibliography ==
- Dales, H. Garth; Woodin, W. Hugh (1996), Super-real fields, London Mathematical Society Monographs. New Series, vol. 14, The Clarendon Press Oxford University Press, ISBN 978-0-19-853991-9, MR 1420859
- Gillman, L.; Jerison, M. (1960), Rings of Continuous Functions, Van Nostrand, ISBN 978-0-442-02691-2
