= Detlef Laugwitz =

German mathematician and historian

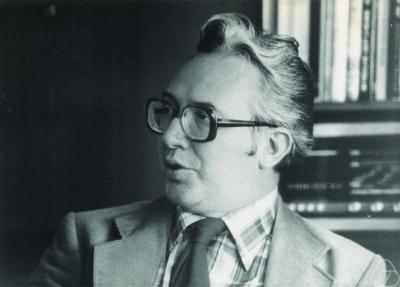
Detlef Laugwitz.

Detlef Laugwitz (1932–2000) was a German mathematician and historian, who worked in differential geometry, history of mathematics, functional analysis, and non-standard analysis.

== Biography ==
He was born on 11 May 1932 in Breslau, Germany. Starting in 1949, he studied mathematics, physics, and philosophy at the Georg-August-University at Göttingen, where he received his doctorate in 1954. Until 1956 he worked in the Mathematical Research Institute of Oberwolfach. In 1958 he became a lecturer at the Technical University of Munich, where he obtained his Habilitation. In 1958 he moved to the Technical University of Darmstadt, where in 1962 he became a professor, and remained until his retirement. From 1976 to 1984 he was a visiting professor at Caltech.

== Work ==
Laugwitz worked in differential geometry of infinite dimensional vector spaces (his dissertation) and in Finsler geometry. In 1958 he and Curt Schmieden developed their own approach to infinitesimals through field extensions, independently of Abraham Robinson. They described this as "infinitesimal mathematics" and leading back to the historical roots in Leibniz. In 1996 he published the standard biography of Bernhard Riemann.

== Publications ==
- Laugwitz, D. (1965). Differential and Riemannian Geometry (first ed.). New York: Academic Press New York. LCCN 64021670. (translated by Fritz Steinhardt); Laugwitz, Detlef (12 May 2014). 2014 pbk reprint of 1st edition. Academic Press. ISBN 978-1-4832-6398-4.
- Laugwitz, D. (1989), "Definite values of infinite sums: aspects of the foundations of infinitesimal analysis around 1820", Archive for History of Exact Sciences, 39 (3): 195–245, doi:10.1007/BF00329867, S2CID 120890300.
- Laugwitz, D. (1999). Bernhard Riemann, 1826-1866: Turning points in the Conception of Mathematics. Boston: Birkhäuser. ISBN 0817640401. LCCN 98017834. (translated by Abe Shenitzer with the editorial assistance of Hardy Grant, Sarah Shenitzer, and the author Detlev Laugwitz)
