= Internal set =

Type of set in mathematical logic

In mathematical logic, in particular in model theory and nonstandard analysis, an internal set is a set that is a member of a model.

The concept of internal sets is a tool in formulating the transfer principle, which concerns the logical relation between the properties of the real numbers R, and the properties of a larger field denoted *R called the hyperreal numbers. The field *R includes, in particular, infinitesimal ("infinitely small") numbers, providing a rigorous mathematical justification for their use. Roughly speaking, the idea is to express analysis over R in a suitable language of mathematical logic, and then point out that this language applies equally well to *R. This turns out to be possible because at the set-theoretic level, the propositions in such a language are interpreted to apply only to internal sets rather than to all sets (note that the term "language" is used in a loose sense in the above).

Edward Nelson's internal set theory is an axiomatic approach to nonstandard analysis (see also Palmgren at constructive nonstandard analysis). Conventional infinitary accounts of nonstandard analysis also use the concept of internal sets.

== Internal sets in the ultrapower construction ==
Relative to the ultrapower construction of the hyperreal numbers as equivalence classes of sequences $\langle u_n\rangle$ of reals, an internal subset [A_{n}] of *R is one defined by a sequence of real sets $\langle A_n \rangle$, where a hyperreal $[u_n]$ is said to belong to the set $[A_n]\subseteq \; ^*\!{\mathbb R}$ if and only if the set of indices n such that $u_n \in A_n$, is a member of the ultrafilter used in the construction of *R.

More generally, an internal entity is a member of the natural extension of a real entity. Thus, every element of *R is internal; a subset of *R is internal if and only if it is a member of the natural extension ${ } ^* \mathcal{P}(\mathbb{R})$ of the power set $\mathcal{P}(\mathbb{R})$ of R; etc.

== Internal subsets of the reals ==
Every internal subset of *R that is a subset of (the embedded copy of) R is necessarily finite (see Theorem 3.9.1 Goldblatt, 1998). In other words, every internal infinite subset of the hyperreals necessarily contains nonstandard elements.

== See also ==
- Standard part function
- Superstructure (mathematics)
