= Hyperfinite set =

Type of internal set in nonstandard analysis

In nonstandard analysis, a branch of mathematics, a hyperfinite set or *-finite set is a type of internal set. An internal set H of internal cardinality g ∈ *N (the hypernaturals) is hyperfinite if and only if there exists an internal bijection between G = {1,2,3,...,g} and H. Hyperfinite sets share the properties of finite sets: A hyperfinite set has minimal and maximal elements, and a hyperfinite union of a hyperfinite collection of hyperfinite sets may be derived. The sum of the elements of any hyperfinite subset of *R always exists, leading to the possibility of well-defined integration.

Hyperfinite sets can be used to approximate other sets. If a hyperfinite set approximates an interval, it is called a near interval with respect to that interval. Consider a hyperfinite set $K = \{k_1,k_2, \dots ,k_n\}$ with a hypernatural n. K is a near interval for [a,b] if k_{1} = a and k_{n} = b, and if the difference between successive elements of K is infinitesimal. Phrased otherwise, the requirement is that for every r ∈ [a,b] there is a k_{i} ∈ K such that k_{i} ≈ r. This, for example, allows for an approximation to the unit circle, considered as the set $e^{i\theta}$ for θ in the interval [0,2π].

In general, subsets of hyperfinite sets are not hyperfinite, often because they do not contain the extreme elements of the parent set.

== Ultrapower construction ==
In terms of the ultrapower construction, the hyperreal line *R is defined as the collection of equivalence classes of sequences $\langle u_n, n=1,2,\ldots \rangle$ of real numbers u_{n}. Namely, the equivalence class defines a hyperreal, denoted $[u_n]$ in Goldblatt's notation. Similarly, an arbitrary hyperfinite set in *R is of the form $[A_n]$, and is defined by a sequence $\langle A_n \rangle$ of finite sets $A_n \subseteq \mathbb{R}, n=1,2,\ldots$
