= Constructive nonstandard analysis =

In mathematics, constructive nonstandard analysis is a version of Abraham Robinson's nonstandard analysis, developed by Moerdijk (1995), Palmgren (1998), Ruokolainen (2004). Ruokolainen wrote:

The possibility of constructivization of nonstandard analysis was studied by Palmgren (1997, 1998, 2001). The model of constructive nonstandard analysis studied there is an extension of Moerdijk’s (1995) model for constructive nonstandard arithmetic.

== See also ==
- Constructive analysis
- Smooth infinitesimal analysis
- John Lane Bell
