= Reciprocal rule =

Derivative method in calculus

In calculus, the reciprocal rule gives the derivative of the reciprocal of a function f in terms of the derivative of f. The reciprocal rule can be used to show that the power rule holds for negative exponents if it has already been established for positive exponents. Also, one can readily deduce the quotient rule from the reciprocal rule and the product rule.

The reciprocal rule states that if f is differentiable at a point x and f(x) ≠ 0 then g(x) = 1/f(x) is also differentiable at x and

$$g'(x) = -\frac{f'(x)}{f(x)^2}.$$

== Proof ==
This proof relies on the premise that $f$ is differentiable at $x,$ and on the theorem that $f$ is then also necessarily continuous there. Applying the definition of the derivative of $g$ at $x$ with $f(x) \ne 0$ gives
$$\begin{align}
g'(x) = \frac d {dx} \left(\frac {1} {f(x)}\right) & = \lim_{h\to0} \left (\frac{\frac {1}{f(x+h)} - \frac {1}{f(x)}} {h} \right )\\
& = \lim_{h\to0} \left( \frac{f(x)-f(x+h)}{h \cdot f(x) \cdot f(x+h)} \right)\\
& = \lim_{h\to0} \left (- (\frac {(f(x+h)-f(x)}{h}) \cdot (\frac {1} {f(x) \cdot f(x+h)}) \right) \end{align}$$
The limit of this product exists and is equal to the product of the existing limits of its factors:
$$\left(- \lim_{h\to0} \frac{f(x+h)-f(x)}{h} \right)\cdot\left( \lim_{h\to0} \frac {1}{f(x)\cdot f(x+h)}\right)$$
Because of the differentiability of $f$ at $x$ the first limit equals $-f'(x),$ and because of $f(x)\ne 0$ and the continuity of $f$ at $x$ the second limit equals $1/f(x)^2,$ thus yielding
$$g'(x) = -f'(x) \cdot \frac {1}{f(x)^2} = -\frac{f'(x)}{f(x)^2}$$

== A weak reciprocal rule that follows algebraically from the product rule ==
It may be argued that since

$$f(x)\cdot \frac 1 {f(x)} = 1,$$

an application of the product rule says that

$$f'(x) \left( \frac 1 f\right)(x) + f(x) \left( \frac 1 f\right)'(x) = 0,$$

and this may be algebraically rearranged to say

$$\left( \frac 1 f\right)'(x) = \frac{-f'(x)}{f(x)^2}.$$

However, this fails to prove that 1/f is differentiable at x; it is valid only when differentiability of 1/f at x is already established. In that way, it is a weaker result than the reciprocal rule proved above. However, in the context of differential algebra, in which there is nothing that is not differentiable and in which derivatives are not defined by limits, it is in this way that the reciprocal rule and the more general quotient rule are established.

== Application to generalization of the power rule ==
Often the power rule, stating that $\tfrac{d}{dx}(x^n) = nx^{n-1}$, is proved by methods that are valid only when n is a nonnegative integer. This can be extended to negative integers n by letting $n = -m$, where m is a positive integer.

$$\begin{align}
\frac d {dx} x^n & = \frac d {dx}\,\left(\frac 1 {x^{m}}\right) \\
& = -\frac{\frac {d} {dx} x^{m}}{(x^{m})^2}, \text{ by the reciprocal rule} \\
& = -\frac{mx^{m-1}}{x^{2m}}, \text{ by the power rule applied to the positive integer } m, \\
& = -mx^{-m-1} = nx^{n-1}, \text{ by substituting back }n = -m.
\end{align}$$

== Application to a proof of the quotient rule ==
The reciprocal rule is a special case of the quotient rule, which states that if f and g are differentiable at x and g(x) ≠ 0 then

$$\frac d {dx}\, \left[\frac{f(x)}{g(x)}\right] = \frac{g(x)f\,'(x) - f(x)g'(x)}{[g(x)]^2}.$$

The quotient rule can be proved by writing

$$\frac{f(x)}{g(x)} = f(x) \cdot \frac 1 {g(x)}$$

and then first applying the product rule, and then applying the reciprocal rule to the second factor.

$$\begin{align}
\frac d{dx} \left[\frac{f(x)}{g(x)}\right] &= \frac d{dx} \left[f(x) \cdot \frac 1 {g(x)}\right]\\
&= f'(x) \cdot \frac{1}{g(x)} + f(x) \cdot \frac d{dx} \left[\frac{1}{g(x)}\right]\\
&= f'(x) \cdot \frac{1}{g(x)} + f(x) \cdot \left[\frac{-g'(x)}{g(x)^2}\right]\\
&= \frac{f'(x)}{g(x)} - \frac{f(x)g'(x)}{[g(x)]^2}\\
&= \frac{f'(x)g(x)-f(x)g'(x)}{[g(x)]^2}.
\end{align}$$

== Application to differentiation of trigonometric functions ==
By using the reciprocal rule one can find the derivative of the secant and cosecant functions.

For the secant function:

$$\begin{align}
\frac d {dx} \sec x & = \frac d {dx} \, \left(\frac 1 {\cos x}\right) = \frac{-\frac d {dx} \cos x}{\cos^2 x} = \frac{\sin x}{\cos^2 x} = \frac 1 {\cos x}\cdot\frac{\sin x}{\cos x} = \sec x\tan x.
\end{align}$$

The cosecant is treated similarly:

$$\begin{align}
\frac d {dx} \csc x & = \frac d {dx} \, \left(\frac 1 {\sin x}\right) = \frac{-\frac d {dx} \sin x}{\sin^2 x} = -\frac{\cos x}{\sin^2 x} = -\frac 1 {\sin x}\cdot\frac{\cos x}{\sin x} = -\csc x\cot x.
\end{align}$$

== See also ==
- Chain rule – For derivatives of composed functions
- Difference quotient – Expression in calculus
- Differentiation of integrals – Problem in mathematics
- Differentiation rules – Rules for computing derivatives of functions
- General Leibniz rule – Generalization of the product rule in calculus
- Integration by parts – Mathematical method in calculus
- Inverse functions and differentiation – Formula for the derivative of an inverse function
- Linearity of differentiation – Calculus property
- Product rule – Formula for the derivative of a product
- Quotient rule – Formula for the derivative of a ratio of functions
- Table of derivatives – Rules for computing derivatives of functions
- Vector calculus identities – Mathematical identities
