= Quotient rule =

Formula for the derivative of a ratio of functions

In calculus, the quotient rule is a method of finding the derivative of a function that is the ratio of two differentiable functions. Let $\textstyle h(x) = \frac{f(x)}{g(x)}$, where both $f$ and $g$ are differentiable and $g(x)\neq 0$. The quotient rule states that the derivative of $h(x)$ is
$$h'(x) = \frac{f'(x)g(x) - f(x)g'(x)}{(g(x))^2}.$$

It is provable in many ways by using other derivative rules.

== Examples ==
=== Example 1: Basic example ===
Given $\textstyle h(x) = \frac{e^x}{x^2}$, let $f(x) = e^x$, $g(x) = x^2$, then using the quotient rule:
$$\begin{align}
\frac{d}{dx} \left(\frac{e^x}{x^2}\right) &= \frac{\left(\frac{d}{dx}e^x\right)(x^2) - (e^x)\left(\frac{d}{dx} x^2\right)}{(x^2)^2} \\
&= \frac{(e^x)(x^2) - (e^x)(2x)}{x^4} \\
&= \frac{x^2 e^x - 2x e^x}{x^4} \\
&= \frac{x e^x - 2 e^x}{x^3} \\
&= \frac{e^x(x - 2)}{x^3}.
\end{align}$$

=== Example 2: Derivative of tangent function ===
The quotient rule can be used to find the derivative of $\tan x = \frac{\sin x}{\cos x}$ as follows:
$$\begin{align}
\frac{d}{dx} \tan x &= \frac{d}{dx} \left(\frac{\sin x}{\cos x}\right) \\
&= \frac{\left(\frac{d}{dx}\sin x\right)(\cos x) - (\sin x)\left(\frac{d}{dx}\cos x\right)}{\cos^2 x} \\
&= \frac{(\cos x)(\cos x) - (\sin x)(-\sin x)}{\cos^2 x} \\
&= \frac{\cos^2 x + \sin^2 x}{\cos^2 x} \\
&= \frac{1}{\cos^2 x} = \sec^2 x.
\end{align}$$

== Reciprocal rule ==
The reciprocal rule is a special case of the quotient rule in which the numerator $f(x)=1$. Applying the quotient rule gives
$$h'(x)=\frac{d}{dx}\left[\frac{1}{g(x)}\right]=\frac{0 \cdot g(x) - 1 \cdot g'(x)}{g(x)^2}=\frac{-g'(x)}{g(x)^2}.$$

Utilizing the chain rule yields the same result.

== Proofs ==
=== Proof from derivative definition and limit properties ===
Let $\textstyle h(x) = \frac{f(x)}{g(x)}$. Applying the definition of the derivative and properties of limits gives the following proof, with the term $f(x) g(x)$ added and subtracted to allow splitting and factoring in subsequent steps without affecting the value:
$$\begin{align} h'(x)
&= \lim_{k\to 0} \frac{h(x+k) - h(x)}{k} \\
&= \lim_{k\to 0} \frac{\frac{f(x+k)}{g(x+k)} - \frac{f(x)}{g(x)}}{k} \\
&= \lim_{k\to 0} \frac{f(x+k)g(x) - f(x)g(x+k)}{k \cdot g(x)g(x+k)} \\
&= \lim_{k\to 0} \frac{f(x+k)g(x) - f(x)g(x+k)}{k} \cdot \lim_{k\to 0}\frac{1}{g(x)g(x+k)} \\
&= \lim_{k\to 0} \left[\frac{f(x+k)g(x) - f(x)g(x) + f(x)g(x) - f(x)g(x+k)}{k} \right] \cdot \frac{1}{[g(x)]^2} \\
&= \left[\lim_{k\to 0} \frac{f(x+k)g(x) - f(x)g(x)}{k} - \lim_{k\to 0}\frac{f(x)g(x+k) - f(x)g(x)}{k} \right] \cdot \frac{1}{[g(x)]^2} \\
&= \left[\lim_{k\to 0} \frac{f(x+k) - f(x)}{k} \cdot g(x) - f(x) \cdot \lim_{k\to 0}\frac{g(x+k) - g(x)}{k} \right] \cdot \frac{1}{[g(x)]^2} \\
&= \frac{f'(x)g(x) - f(x)g'(x)}{[g(x)]^2}.
\end{align}$$
The limit evaluation $\lim_{k \to 0}\frac{1}{g(x+k)g(x)}=\frac{1}{[g(x)]^2}$ is justified by the differentiability of $g(x)$, implying continuity, which can be expressed as $\textstyle \lim_{k \to 0}g(x+k) = g(x)$.

=== Proof using implicit differentiation ===
Let $\textstyle h(x) = \frac{f(x)}{g(x)}$, so that $f(x) = g(x)h(x)$.

The product rule then gives $f'(x) = g'(x)h(x) + g(x)h'(x)$.

Solving for $h'(x)$ and substituting back for $h(x)$ gives:
$$\begin{align}
h'(x) &= \frac{f'(x) -g'(x)h(x)}{g(x)} \\
&= \frac{f'(x) - g'(x)\cdot\frac{f(x)}{g(x)}}{g(x)} \\
&= \frac{f'(x)g(x) - f(x)g'(x)}{[g(x)]^2}.
\end{align}$$

=== Proof using the reciprocal rule or chain rule ===
Let $\textstyle h(x) = \frac{f(x)}{g(x)} = f(x) \cdot \frac{1}{g(x)}$.

Then the product rule gives $\textstyle h'(x) = f'(x)\cdot\frac{1}{g(x)} + f(x) \cdot \frac{d}{dx}\left[\frac{1}{g(x)}\right]$.

To evaluate the derivative in the second term, apply the reciprocal rule, or the power rule along with the chain rule:
$$\begin{align}
\frac{d}{dx}\left[\frac{1}{g(x)}\right] &= -\frac{1}{g(x)^2} \cdot g'(x) \\
&= \frac{-g'(x)}{g(x)^2} .
\end{align}$$

Substituting the result into the expression gives
$$\begin{align} h'(x)
&= f'(x)\cdot\frac{1}{g(x)} + f(x)\cdot\left[\frac{-g'(x)}{g(x)^2}\right] \\
&= \frac{f'(x)}{g(x)} - \frac{f(x)g'(x)}{g(x)^2} \\
&= {\frac{g(x)}{g(x)}}\cdot{\frac{f'(x)}{g(x)}} - \frac{f(x)g'(x)}{g(x)^2} \\
&= \frac{f'(x)g(x) - f(x)g'(x)}{g(x)^2} .
\end{align}$$

=== Proof by logarithmic differentiation ===
Let $\textstyle h(x) = \frac{f(x)}{g(x)}$. Taking the absolute value and natural logarithm of both sides of the equation gives
$$\ln|h(x)| = \ln\left|\frac{f(x)}{g(x)}\right| .$$

Applying properties of the absolute value and logarithms,
$$\ln|h(x)| = \ln|f(x)| - \ln|g(x)| .$$

Taking the logarithmic derivative of both sides,
$$\frac{h'(x)}{h(x)} = \frac{f'(x)}{f(x)} - \frac{g'(x)}{g(x)} .$$

Solving for $h'(x)$ and substituting back $\tfrac{f(x)}{g(x)}$ for $h(x)$ gives:
$$\begin{align} h'(x)
&= h(x)\left[\frac{f'(x)}{f(x)}-\frac{g'(x)}{g(x)}\right] \\
&= \frac{f(x)}{g(x)}\left[\frac{f'(x)}{f(x)}-\frac{g'(x)}{g(x)}\right] \\
&= \frac{f'(x)}{g(x)}-\frac{f(x)g'(x)}{g(x)^2} \\
&= \frac{f'(x)g(x)-f(x)g'(x)}{g(x)^2} .
\end{align}$$

Taking the absolute value of the functions is necessary for the logarithmic differentiation of functions that may have negative values, as logarithms are only real-valued for positive arguments. This works because $\textstyle \frac{d}{dx}(\ln\vert u\vert) = \frac{u'}{u}$, which justifies taking the absolute value of the functions for logarithmic differentiation.

== Higher order derivatives ==
Implicit differentiation can be used to compute the nth derivative of a quotient (partially in terms of its first n−1 derivatives). For example, differentiating $f=gh$ twice (resulting in $f'' = g''h + 2g'h' + gh''$) and then solving for $h''$ yields
$$h'' = \left(\frac{f}{g}\right)'' = \frac{f''-g''h-2g'h'}{g}.$$

== See also ==
- Chain rule – Formula in calculus
- Differentiation of integrals – Problem of the derivative of the mean value integral
- Differentiation rules – Rules for computing derivatives of functions
- General Leibniz rule – Generalization of the product rule in calculus
- Inverse functions and differentiation – Formula for the derivative of an inverse function
- Linearity of differentiation – Calculus property
- Product rule – Formula for the derivative of a product
- Reciprocal rule – Derivative method in calculus
- Table of derivatives – Rules for computing derivatives of functions
- Vector calculus identities – Mathematical identities
