= Logarithmic derivative =

Mathematical operation in calculus

In mathematics, specifically in calculus and complex analysis, the logarithmic derivative of a function f is defined by the formula
$$\frac{f'}{f}$$
where f′ is the derivative of f. Intuitively, this is the infinitesimal relative change in f; that is, the infinitesimal absolute change in f, namely f′ scaled by the current value of f.

When f is a function f(x) of a real variable x, and takes real, strictly positive values, this is equal to the derivative of ln f(x), or the natural logarithm of f. This follows directly from the chain rule:
$$\frac{d}{dx}\ln f(x) = \frac{1}{f(x)} \frac{df(x)}{dx}$$

== Basic properties ==
Many properties of the real logarithm also apply to the logarithmic derivative, even when the function does not take values in the positive reals. For example, since the logarithm of a product is the sum of the logarithms of the factors, we have
$$(\log uv)' = (\log u + \log v)' = (\log u)' + (\log v)' .$$
So for positive-real-valued functions, the logarithmic derivative of a product is the sum of the logarithmic derivatives of the factors. But we can also use the Leibniz law for the derivative of a product to get
$$\frac{(uv)'}{uv} = \frac{u'v + uv'}{uv} = \frac{u'}{u} + \frac{v'}{v} .$$
Thus, it is true for any function that the logarithmic derivative of a product is the sum of the logarithmic derivatives of the factors (when they are defined).

A corollary to this is that the logarithmic derivative of the reciprocal of a function is the negation of the logarithmic derivative of the function:
$$\frac{(1/u)'}{1/u} = \frac{-u'/u^{2}}{1/u} = -\frac{u'}{u} ,$$
just as the logarithm of the reciprocal of a positive real number is the negation of the logarithm of the number.

More generally, the logarithmic derivative of a quotient is the difference of the logarithmic derivatives of the dividend and the divisor:
$$\frac{(u/v)'}{u/v} = \frac{(u'v - uv')/v^{2}}{u/v} = \frac{u'}{u} - \frac{v'}{v} ,$$
just as the logarithm of a quotient is the difference of the logarithms of the dividend and the divisor.

Generalising in another direction, the logarithmic derivative of a power (with constant real exponent) is the product of the exponent and the logarithmic derivative of the base:
$$\frac{(u^{k})'}{u^{k}} = \frac {ku^{k-1}u'}{u^{k}} = k \frac{u'}{u} ,$$
just as the logarithm of a power is the product of the exponent and the logarithm of the base.

Finally, the logarithmic derivative of the exponential function of u is just the derivative of u:
$$\frac{(e^u)'}{e^u} = \frac {u' e^u}{e^u} = u' ,$$
just as the logarithm of the exponential function of a function is just the original function.

In summary, both derivatives and logarithms have a product rule, a reciprocal rule, a quotient rule, and a power rule (compare the list of logarithmic identities); each pair of rules is related through the logarithmic derivative.

== Computing ordinary derivatives using logarithmic derivatives ==
Logarithmic derivatives can simplify the computation of derivatives requiring the product rule while producing the same result. The procedure is as follows: Suppose that f(x) = u(x)v(x) and that we wish to compute f′(x). Instead of computing it directly as f′ = u′v + v′u, we compute its logarithmic derivative. That is, we compute:
$$\frac{f'}{f} = \frac{u'}{u} + \frac{v'}{v}.$$

Multiplying through by f computes f′:
$$f' = f\cdot\left(\frac{u'}{u} + \frac{v'}{v}\right).$$

This technique is most useful when f is a product of a large number of factors. This technique makes it possible to compute f′ by computing the logarithmic derivative of each factor, summing, and multiplying by f.

For example, we can compute the logarithmic derivative of
$$(e^x)^2(x-2)^3(x-3)(x-1)^{-1}$$
to be
$$2 + \frac{3}{x-2} + \frac{1}{x-3} - \frac{1}{x-1} .$$

== Integrating factors ==
The logarithmic derivative idea is closely connected to the integrating factor method for first-order differential equations. In operator terms, write
$$D = \frac{d}{dx}$$
and let M denote the operator of multiplication by some given function G(x). Then
$$M^{-1} D M$$
can be written (by the product rule) as
$$D + M^{*}$$
where $M^{*}$ now denotes the multiplication operator by the logarithmic derivative
$$\frac{G'}{G}$$

In practice we are given an operator such as
$$D + F = L$$
and wish to solve equations
$$L(h) = f$$
for the function h, given f. This then reduces to solving
$$\frac{G'}{G} = F$$
which has as solution
$$\exp \textstyle ( \int F )$$
with any indefinite integral of F.

== Complex analysis ==
The formula as given can be applied more widely; for example if f(z) is a meromorphic function, it makes sense at all complex values of z at which f has neither a zero nor a pole. Further, at a zero or a pole the logarithmic derivative behaves in a way that is easily analysed in terms of the particular case

z^{n}

with n an integer, n ≠ 0. The logarithmic derivative is then
$$n/z$$
and one can draw the general conclusion that for f meromorphic, the singularities of the logarithmic derivative of f are all simple poles, with residue n from a zero of order n, residue −n from a pole of order n. See argument principle. This information is often exploited in contour integration.

In the field of Nevanlinna theory, an important lemma states that the proximity function of a logarithmic derivative is small with respect to the Nevanlinna characteristic of the original function, for instance $m(r,h'/h) = S(r,h) = o(T(r,h))$.

== The multiplicative group ==
Behind the use of the logarithmic derivative lie two basic facts about GL_{1}, that is, the multiplicative group of real numbers or other field. The differential operator
$$X\frac{d}{dX}$$
is invariant under dilation (replacing X by aX for a constant). And the differential form
$$\frac{dx}{X}$$
is likewise invariant. For functions F into GL_{1}, the formula
$$\frac{dF}{F}$$
is therefore a pullback of the invariant form.

== Examples ==
- Exponential growth and exponential decay are processes with constant logarithmic derivative.
- In mathematical finance, the Greek λ is the logarithmic derivative of derivative price with respect to underlying price.
- In numerical analysis, the condition number is the infinitesimal relative change in the output for a relative change in the input, and is thus a ratio of logarithmic derivatives.
- The digamma function, and by extension the polygamma function, is defined in terms of the logarithmic derivative of the gamma function.

== See also ==
- Generalizations of the derivative – Fundamental construction of differential calculus
- Logarithmic differentiation – Method of mathematical differentiation
- Elasticity of a function
- Product integral
