= WISEA J085101.70+163857.3 =

Radio galaxy in the constellation Cancer

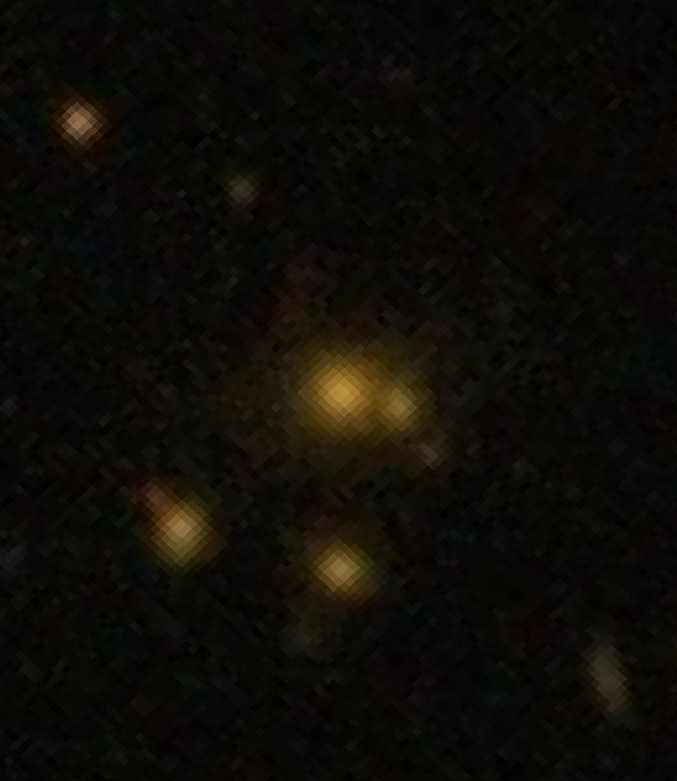
- SDSS image of WISEA J085101.70+163857.3

Observation data (J2000.0 epoch)
- Constellation: Cancer
- Right ascension: 08^{h} 51^{m} 01.70^{s}
- Declination: +16° 38′ 57.36″
- Redshift: 0.332459
- Heliocentric radial velocity: 99,944 ± 33 km/s
- Distance: 4,807.9 ± 336.6 Mly (1,474.10 ± 103.19 Mpc)
- Group or cluster: WHL J085101.7+163857
- magnitude (J): 15.03
- magnitude (H): 13.83

Characteristics
- Type: BrClG
- Size: ~1,040,000 ly (318.8 kpc) (estimated)

Other designations
- 2MASX J08510173+1638570, [CCH85] 0848+1650, NVSS J085102+163906, SDSS J085101.72+163857.2, [YHW2016] J132.75719+16.64924, WHL J085101.7+163847 BCG, LEDA 3734725

WISEA J085101.70+163857.3 also known as [YHW2016] J132.75719+16.64924 and J085101.56+163848.6, is a radio galaxy located in the constellation of Cancer. The redshift of the galaxy is estimated to be located at (z) 0.332.

== Description ==
WISEA J085101.70+163857.3 is an elliptical galaxy in stages of a gravitational interaction with another galaxy. It is also the brightest cluster galaxy of the WHL J085101.7+163857 galaxy cluster with 14 confirmed galaxy member candidates but it does not belong to any superclusters. The R-band magnitude of the galaxy has been estimated to be 18.04 while its absolute magnitude is -23.32.

The nucleus is found to be active and it has been categorized as a non-bend Fanaroff-Riley Class Type I/II radio galaxy with the total flux density calculated to be 18.70 mJy at 1.4 GHz frequencies by NRAO VLA Sky Survey (NVSS). The radio morphology is found to be hybrid with one radio lobe being classified of FR I type whereas the other lobe is of FR II type although evidence confirms it has both characteristics of Fanaroff-Riley Class Type I and Type II radio galaxies, with presence of linear structures located near the radio core and edges of the structure. The radio core itself, has a measured core flux density of 7.45 mJy while the radio emission has a flux density of 31.00 mJy. The total radio power has been calculated to be 11.58 × 10^{24} WHz^{-1}.

A study found it is a wide-angle-tailed radio galaxy (WAT). The flux density at 3 MHz is 14.94 mJy whereas the spectral index between 1.4 and 3 GHz is 1.06α. There is also a presence of a radio jet with the opening angle estimated to be 164.4° while the jet curvature radius is 148.3 arcseconds. The largest angular size of the source is 99 arcseconds whereas the largest linear size is 489 kiloparsecs. A logarithmic radio luminosity of 25.12 W Hz-1 at 1.4 GHz has been calculated for the source.
