= Inverse function rule =

Formula for the derivative of an inverse function

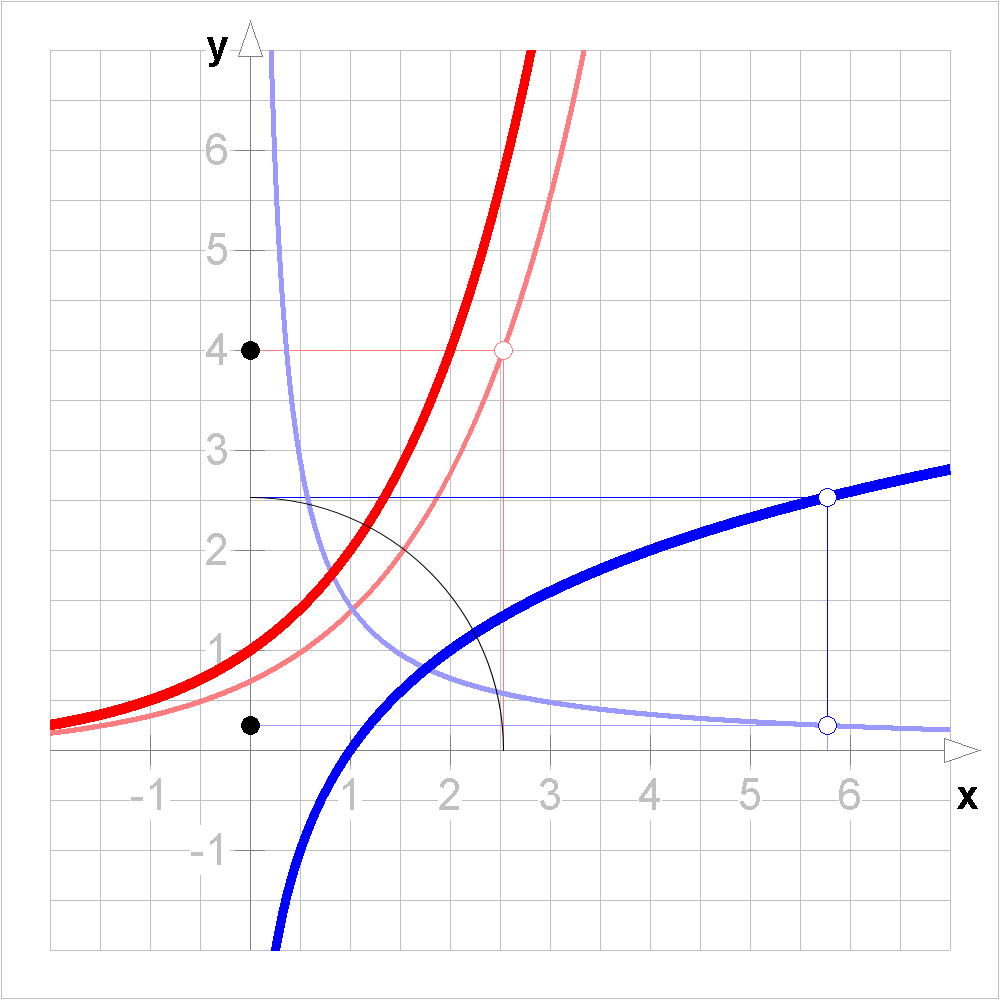
The thick blue curve and the thick red curve are inverse to each other. A thin curve is the derivative of the same colored thick curve. Inverse function rule: ${\color{CornflowerBlue}{f'}}(x) = \frac{1}{{\color{Salmon}{\left[f^{-1}\right]'}}({\color{Blue}{f}}(x))}$ Example for arbitrary $x_0 \approx 5.8$: ${\color{CornflowerBlue}{f'}}(x_0) = \frac{1}{4}$ ${\color{Salmon}{\left[f^{-1}\right]'}}({\color{Blue}{f}}(x_0)) = 4~$

In calculus, the inverse function rule is a formula that expresses the derivative of the inverse of a bijective and differentiable function f in terms of the derivative of f. More precisely, if the inverse of $f$ is denoted as $f^{-1}$, where $f^{-1}(y) = x$ if and only if $f(x) = y$, then the inverse function rule is, in Lagrange's notation,

$$\left[f^{-1}\right]'(y)=\frac{1}{f'\left( f^{-1}(y) \right)}.$$

This formula holds in general whenever $f$ is continuous and injective on an interval I, with $f$ being differentiable at $f^{-1}(y)$($\in I$) and where$f'(f^{-1}(y)) \ne 0$. The same formula is also equivalent to the expression

$$\mathcal{D}\left[f^{-1}\right]=\frac{1}{(\mathcal{D} f)\circ \left(f^{-1}\right)},$$

where $\mathcal{D}$ denotes the unary derivative operator (on the space of functions) and $\circ$ denotes function composition.

Geometrically, a function and inverse function have graphs that are reflections, in the line $y=x$. This reflection operation turns the gradient of any line into its reciprocal.

Assuming that $f$ has an inverse in a neighbourhood of $x$ and that its derivative at that point is non-zero, its inverse is guaranteed to be differentiable at $x$ and have a derivative given by the above formula.

The inverse function rule may also be expressed in Leibniz's notation. As that notation suggests,

$$\frac{dx}{dy}\,\frac{dy}{dx} = 1.$$

This relation is obtained by differentiating the equation $f^{-1}(y)=x$ in terms of x and applying the chain rule, yielding that:

$$\frac{dx}{dy}\,\frac{dy}{dx} = \frac{dx}{dx}$$

considering that the derivative of x with respect to x is 1.

== Derivation ==
Let $f$ be an invertible (bijective) function, let $x$ be in the domain of $f$, and let $y=f(x).$ Let $g=f^{-1}.$ So, $f(g(y))=y.$ Differentiating this equation with respect to $y$, and using the chain rule, one gets

$$f'(g(y))\cdot g'(y)=1.$$

That is,

$$g'(y)=\frac 1 {f'(g(y))}$$

or

$$\left[f^{-1}\right]^{\prime}(y) = \frac{1}{f^{\prime}(f^{-1}(y))}.$$

== Examples ==
- $y = x^2$ (for positive x) has inverse $x = \sqrt{y}$.

$$\frac{dy}{dx} = 2x
\mbox{ }\mbox{ }\mbox{ }\mbox{ };
\mbox{ }\mbox{ }\mbox{ }\mbox{ }
\frac{dx}{dy} = \frac{1}{2\sqrt{y}}=\frac{1}{2x}$$

$$\frac{dy}{dx}\,\frac{dx}{dy} = 2x \cdot\frac{1}{2x} = 1.$$

At $x=0$, however, there is a problem: the graph of the square root function becomes vertical, corresponding to a horizontal tangent for the square function.

- $y = e^x$ (for real x) has inverse $x = \ln{y}$ (for positive $y$)

$$\frac{dy}{dx} = e^x
\mbox{ }\mbox{ }\mbox{ }\mbox{ };
\mbox{ }\mbox{ }\mbox{ }\mbox{ }
\frac{dx}{dy} = \frac{1}{y} = e^{-x}$$

$$\frac{dy}{dx}\,\frac{dx}{dy} = e^x e^{-x} = 1.$$

== Additional properties ==
- Integrating this relationship gives

$${f^{-1}}(y)=\int\frac{1}{f'({f^{-1}}(y))}\,{dy} + C.$$

This is only useful if the integral exists. In particular we need $f'(x)$ to be non-zero across the range of integration.

It follows that a function that has a continuous derivative has an inverse in a neighbourhood of every point where the derivative is non-zero. This need not be true if the derivative is not continuous.

- Another very interesting and useful property is the following:

$$\int f^{-1}(y)\, {dy} = y f^{-1}(y) - F(f^{-1}(y)) + C$$

where $F$ denotes the antiderivative of $f$.

- The inverse of the derivative of f(x) is also of interest, as it is used in showing the convexity of the Legendre transform.

Let $z = f'(x)$ then we have, assuming $f''(x) \neq 0$:
$$\frac{d}{dz}\left[f'\right]^{-1}(z) = \frac{1}{f''(x)}$$
This can be shown using the previous notation $y = f(x)$. Then we have:

$$f'(x) = \frac{dy}{dx} = \frac{dy}{dz} \frac{dz}{dx} =  \frac{dy}{dz} f''(x) \Rightarrow \frac{dy}{dz} = \frac{f'(x) }{f''(x)}$$
Therefore:

$$\frac{d}{dz}[f']^{-1}(z) = \frac{dx}{dz} = \frac{dy}{dz}\frac{dx}{dy} = \frac{f'(x)}{f''(x)}\frac{1}{f'(x)} = \frac{1}{f''(x)}$$

By induction, we can generalize this result for any integer $n \ge 1$, with $z = f^{(n)}(x)$, the nth derivative of f(x), and $y = f^{(n-1)}(x)$, assuming $f^{(i)}(x) \neq 0 \text{ for } 0 < i \le n+1$:

$$\frac{d}{dz}\left[f^{(n)}\right]^{-1}(z) = \frac{1}{f^{(n+1)}(x)}$$

== Higher order derivatives ==
The chain rule given above is obtained by differentiating the identity $f^{-1}(y)=x$ with respect to y, where $y=f(x)$. One can continue the same process for higher derivatives. Differentiating the identity twice with respect to x, one obtains

$$\frac{d^2y}{dx^2}\,\frac{dx}{dy} + \frac{d}{dx} \left(\frac{dx}{dy}\right)\,\left(\frac{dy}{dx}\right)  =  0,$$

that is simplified further by the chain rule as

$$\frac{d^2y}{dx^2}\,\frac{dx}{dy} + \frac{d^2x}{dy^2}\,\left(\frac{dy}{dx}\right)^2  =  0.$$

Replacing the first derivative, using the identity obtained earlier, we get

$$\frac{d^2y}{dx^2} = - \frac{d^2x}{dy^2}\,\left(\frac{dy}{dx}\right)^3$$

which implies

$$\frac{d^2x}{dy^2} = -\frac{d^2y/dx^2}{\left(dy/dx\right)^3}.$$

Similarly for the third derivative we have

$$\frac{d^3y}{dx^3} = - \frac{d^3x}{dy^3}\,\left(\frac{dy}{dx}\right)^4 -
3 \frac{d^2x}{dy^2}\,\frac{d^2y}{dx^2}\,\left(\frac{dy}{dx}\right)^2.$$

Using the formula for the second derivative, we get

$$\frac{d^3y}{dx^3} = - \frac{d^3x}{dy^3}\,\left(\frac{dy}{dx}\right)^4 +
3 \left(\frac{d^2y}{dx^2}\right)^2\,\left(\frac{dy}{dx}\right)^{-1}$$

which implies

$$\frac{d^3x}{dy^3} = - \frac{d^3y/dx^3}{\left(dy/dx\right)^4} + 3\frac{\left(d^2y/dx^2\right)^2}{\left(dy/dx\right)^5}.$$

In general, higher order derivatives of an inverse function can be expressed with Faà di Bruno's formula. Alternatively, the nth derivative can be written succinctly as an application of a differential operator:

$$\left[f^{-1}\right]^{(n)}(y) = \left.\left[\left(\frac{1}{f'(t)}\frac{d}{dt}\right)^{n} t\right]\right|_{t = f^{-1}(y)}.$$

In Lagrange's notation, the second and third derivatives from the examples above can be found as applying the operator and substituting $t=f^{-1}(y)$ after:

$$\left[f^{-1}\right]''(y) = \left.\left[\frac{1}{f'(t)}\frac{d}{dt}\left(\frac{1}{f'(t)}\frac{d}{dt}t\right)\right]\right|_{t = f^{-1}(y)} = -\frac{f''(f^{-1}(y))}{\left[f'(f^{-1}(y))\right]^3},$$

$$\left[f^{-1}\right]'''(y) = \left.\left[\frac{1}{f'(t)}\frac{d}{dt}\left(\frac{1}{f'(t)}\frac{d}{dt}\left(\frac{1}{f'(t)}\frac{d}{dt}t\right)\right)\right]\right|_{t = f^{-1}(y)} = -\frac{f'''(f^{-1}(y))}{\left[f'(f^{-1}(y))\right]^4} + 3\frac{\left[f''(f^{-1}(y))\right]^2}{\left[f'(f^{-1}(y))\right]^5}.$$

One can also derive the nth-integration of inverse function with base-point a using Cauchy formula for repeated integration whenever $f(f^{-1}(y)) = y$:

$$\left[f^{-1}\right]^{(-n)}(y) = \frac{1}{n!} \left(f^{-1}(a)(y-a)^n + \int_{f^{-1}(a)}^{f^{-1}(y)}\left(y-f(u)\right)^{n}\,du\right).$$

=== Example ===
- $y = e^x$ has the inverse $x = \ln y$. Using the formula for the second derivative of the inverse function,

$$\frac{dy}{dx} = \frac{d^2y}{dx^2} = e^x = y
\mbox{ }\mbox{ }\mbox{ }\mbox{ };
\mbox{ }\mbox{ }\mbox{ }\mbox{ }
\left(\frac{dy}{dx}\right)^3 = y^3;$$

so that

$$\frac{d^2x}{dy^2}\,\cdot\,y^3 + y = 0
\mbox{ }\mbox{ }\mbox{ }\mbox{ };
\mbox{ }\mbox{ }\mbox{ }\mbox{ }
\frac{d^2x}{dy^2} = -\frac{1}{y^2},$$

which agrees with the direct calculation.

== See also ==
- Calculus – Branch of mathematics
- Chain rule – Formula in calculus
- Differentiation of trigonometric functions – Mathematical process of finding the derivative of a trigonometric function
- Differentiation rules – Rules for computing derivatives of functions
- Implicit function theorem – On converting relations to functions of several real variables
- Integration of inverse functions – Mathematical theorem, used in calculus
- Inverse function – Mathematical concept
- Inverse function theorem – Theorem in mathematics
- Table of derivatives – Rules for computing derivatives of functions
- Vector calculus identities – Mathematical identities
