= Differentiation of integrals =

Problem of the derivative of the mean value integral

In mathematics, the problem of differentiation of integrals is that of determining under what circumstances the mean value integral of a suitable function on a small neighbourhood of a point approximates the value of the function at that point. More formally, given a space X with a measure μ and a metric d, one asks for what functions f : X → R does
$$\lim_{r \to 0} \frac1{\mu \big( B_{r} (x) \big)} \int_{B_{r} (x)} f(y) \, \mathrm{d} \mu(y) = f(x)$$
for all (or at least μ-almost all) x ∈ X? (Here, as in the rest of the article, B_{r}(x) denotes the open ball in X with d-radius r and centre x.) This is a natural question to ask, especially in view of the heuristic construction of the Riemann integral, in which it is almost implicit that f(x) is a "good representative" for the values of f near x.

== Theorems on the differentiation of integrals ==
=== Lebesgue measure ===
One result on the differentiation of integrals is the Lebesgue differentiation theorem, as proved by Henri Lebesgue in 1910. Consider n-dimensional Lebesgue measure λ^{n} on n-dimensional Euclidean space R^{n}. Then, for any locally integrable function f : R^{n} → R, one has
$$\lim_{r \to 0} \frac1{\lambda^{n} \big( B_{r} (x) \big)} \int_{B_{r} (x)} f(y) \, \mathrm{d} \lambda^{n} (y) = f(x)$$
for λ^{n}-almost all points x ∈ R^{n}. The measure zero set of "bad" points depends on the function f.

=== Borel measures on R^{n} ===
The result for Lebesgue measure turns out to be a special case of the following result, which is based on the Besicovitch covering theorem: if μ is any locally finite Borel measure on R^{n} and f : R^{n} → R is locally integrable with respect to μ, then
$$\lim_{r \to 0} \frac1{\mu \big( B_{r} (x) \big)} \int_{B_{r} (x)} f(y) \, \mathrm{d} \mu (y) = f(x)$$
for μ-almost all points x ∈ R^{n}.

=== Gaussian measures ===
The problem of the differentiation of integrals is much harder in an infinite-dimensional setting. Consider a separable Hilbert space (H, ⟨ , ⟩) equipped with a Gaussian measure γ. As stated in the article on the Vitali covering theorem, the Vitali covering theorem fails for Gaussian measures on infinite-dimensional Hilbert spaces. Two results of David Preiss (1981 and 1983) show the kind of difficulties that one can expect to encounter in this setting:

- There is a Gaussian measure γ on a separable Hilbert space H and a Borel set M ⊆ H so that, for γ-almost all x ∈ H,
  $$\lim_{r \to 0} \frac{\gamma \big( M \cap B_{r} (x) \big)}{\gamma \big( B_{r} (x) \big)} = 1.$$
- There is a Gaussian measure γ on a separable Hilbert space H and a function f ∈ L^{1}(H, γ; R) such that
  $$\lim_{r \to 0} \inf \left\{ \left. \frac1{\gamma \big( B_{s} (x) \big)} \int_{B_{s} (x)} f(y) \, \mathrm{d} \gamma(y) \right| x \in H, 0 < s < r \right\} = + \infty.$$

However, there is some hope if one has good control over the covariance of γ. Let the covariance operator of γ be S : H → H given by
$$\langle Sx, y \rangle = \int_{H} \langle x, z \rangle \langle y, z \rangle \, \mathrm{d} \gamma(z),$$
or, for some countable orthonormal basis (e_{i})_{i∈N} of H,
$$Sx = \sum_{i \in \mathbf{N}} \sigma_{i}^{2} \langle x, e_{i} \rangle e_{i}.$$

In 1981, Preiss and Jaroslav Tišer showed that if there exists a constant 0 < q < 1 such that
$$\sigma_{i + 1}^{2} \leq q \sigma_{i}^{2},$$
then, for all f ∈ L^{1}(H, γ; R),
$$\frac1{\mu \big( B_{r} (x) \big)} \int_{B_{r} (x)} f(y) \, \mathrm{d} \mu(y) \xrightarrow[r \to 0]{\gamma} f(x),$$
where the convergence is convergence in measure with respect to γ. In 1988, Tišer showed that if
$$\sigma_{i + 1}^{2} \leq \frac{\sigma_{i}^{2}}{i^{\alpha}}$$
for some α > 5 / 2, then
$$\frac1{\mu \big( B_{r} (x) \big)} \int_{B_{r} (x)} f(y) \, \mathrm{d} \mu(y) \xrightarrow[r \to 0]{} f(x),$$
for γ-almost all x and all f ∈ L^{p}(H, γ; R), p > 1.

As of 2007, it is still an open question whether there exists an infinite-dimensional Gaussian measure γ on a separable Hilbert space H so that, for all f ∈ L^{1}(H, γ; R),
$$\lim_{r \to 0} \frac{1}{\gamma \big( B_{r} (x) \big)} \int_{B_{r} (x)} f(y) \, \mathrm{d} \gamma(y) = f(x)$$
for γ-almost all x ∈ H. However, it is conjectured that no such measure exists, since the σ_{i} would have to decay very rapidly.

== See also ==
- Differentiation rules – Rules for computing derivatives of functions
- Leibniz integral rule – Differentiation under the integral sign formula
- Reynolds transport theorem – 3D generalization of the Leibniz integral rule
