= General Leibniz rule =

Generalization of the product rule in calculus

In calculus, the general Leibniz rule, named after Gottfried Wilhelm Leibniz, generalizes the product rule for the derivative of the product of two functions (which is also known as "Leibniz's rule"). It states that if $f$ and $g$ are n-times differentiable functions, then the product $fg$ is also n-times differentiable and its n-th derivative is given by
$$(fg)^{(n)}=\sum_{k=0}^n {n \choose k} f^{(n-k)} g^{(k)},$$
where ${n \choose k}={n!\over k! (n-k)!}$ is the binomial coefficient and $f^{(j)}$ denotes the j-th derivative of f (and in particular $f^{(0)}= f$).

The rule can be proven by using the product rule and mathematical induction.

== Second derivative ==
If, for example, n = 2, the rule gives an expression for the second derivative of a product of two functions:
$$(fg)''(x)=\sum\limits_{k=0}^{2}{\binom{2}{k} f^{(2-k)}(x)g^{(k)}(x)}=f''(x)g(x)+2f'(x)g'(x)+f(x)g''(x).$$

== More than two factors ==
The formula can be generalized to the product of m differentiable functions f_{1},...,f_{m}.
$$\left(f_1 f_2 \cdots f_m\right)^{(n)}=\sum_{k_1+k_2+\cdots+k_m=n} {n \choose k_1, k_2, \ldots, k_m}
\prod_{1\le t\le m}f_{t}^{(k_{t})}\,,$$
where the sum extends over all m-tuples (k_{1},...,k_{m}) of non-negative integers with $\sum_{t=1}^m k_t=n,$ and
$${n \choose k_1, k_2, \ldots, k_m} = \frac{n!}{k_1!\, k_2! \cdots k_m!}$$
are the multinomial coefficients. This is akin to the multinomial formula from algebra.

== Proof ==
The proof of the general Leibniz rule proceeds by induction. Let $f$ and $g$ be $n$-times differentiable functions. The base case when $n=1$ claims that:
$$(fg)' = f'g + fg',$$
which is the usual product rule and is known to be true. Next, assume that the statement holds for a fixed $n \geq 1,$ that is, that
$$(fg)^{(n)}=\sum_{k=0}^n\binom{n}{k} f^{(n-k)}g^{(k)}.$$

Then,
$$\begin{align}
(fg)^{(n+1)} &= \left[ \sum_{k=0}^n \binom{n}{k} f^{(n-k)} g^{(k)} \right]' \\
&= \sum_{k=0}^n \binom{n}{k} f^{(n+1-k)} g^{(k)} + \sum_{k=0}^n \binom{n}{k} f^{(n-k)} g^{(k+1)} \\
&= \sum_{k=0}^n \binom{n}{k} f^{(n+1-k)} g^{(k)} + \sum_{k=1}^{n+1} \binom{n}{k-1} f^{(n+1-k)} g^{(k)} \\
&= \binom{n}{0} f^{(n+1)} g^{(0)} + \sum_{k=1}^{n} \binom{n}{k} f^{(n+1-k)} g^{(k)} + \sum_{k=1}^n \binom{n}{k-1} f^{(n+1-k)} g^{(k)} + \binom{n}{n} f^{(0)} g^{(n+1)} \\
&= \binom{n+1}{0} f^{(n+1)} g^{(0)} + \left( \sum_{k=1}^n \left[\binom{n}{k-1} + \binom{n}{k} \right]f^{(n+1-k)} g^{(k)} \right) + \binom{n+1}{n+1} f^{(0)} g^{(n+1)} \\
&= \binom{n+1}{0} f^{(n+1)} g^{(0)} + \sum_{k=1}^n \binom{n+1}{k}   f^{(n+1-k)} g^{(k)} + \binom{n+1}{n+1}f^{(0)} g^{(n+1)} \\
&= \sum_{k=0}^{n+1} \binom{n+1}{k} f^{(n+1-k)} g^{(k)} .
\end{align}$$
And so the statement holds for $n + 1$, and the proof is complete.

== Relationship to the binomial theorem ==
The Leibniz rule bears a strong resemblance to the binomial theorem, and in fact the binomial theorem can be proven directly from the Leibniz rule by taking $f(x) = e^{ax}$ and $g(x) = e^{bx},$ which gives
$$(a + b)^n e^{(a+b)x} = e^{(a+b)x}\sum_{k=0}^n \binom{n}{k} a^{n-k}b^k,$$
and then dividing both sides by $e^{(a+b)x}.$

== Multivariable calculus ==
With the multi-index notation for partial derivatives of functions of several variables, the Leibniz rule states more generally:
$$\partial^\alpha (fg) = \sum_{ \beta\,:\,\beta \le \alpha  } {\alpha \choose \beta} (\partial^{\beta} f) (\partial^{\alpha - \beta}  g).$$

This formula can be used to derive a formula that computes the symbol of the composition of differential operators. In fact, let P and Q be differential operators (with coefficients that are differentiable sufficiently many times) and $R = P \circ Q.$ Since R is also a differential operator, the symbol of R is given by:
$$R(x, \xi) = e^{-{\langle x, \xi \rangle}} R (e^{\langle x, \xi \rangle}).$$

A direct computation now gives:
$$R(x, \xi) = \sum_\alpha {1 \over \alpha!} \left({\partial \over \partial \xi}\right)^\alpha P(x, \xi) \left({\partial \over \partial x}\right)^\alpha Q(x, \xi).$$

This formula is usually known as the Leibniz formula. It is used to define the composition in the space of symbols, thereby inducing the ring structure.

== See also ==
- Derivation (differential algebra)
- Umbral calculus
