= Nova Methodus pro Maximis et Minimis =

1684 scientific article by Gottfried Leibniz

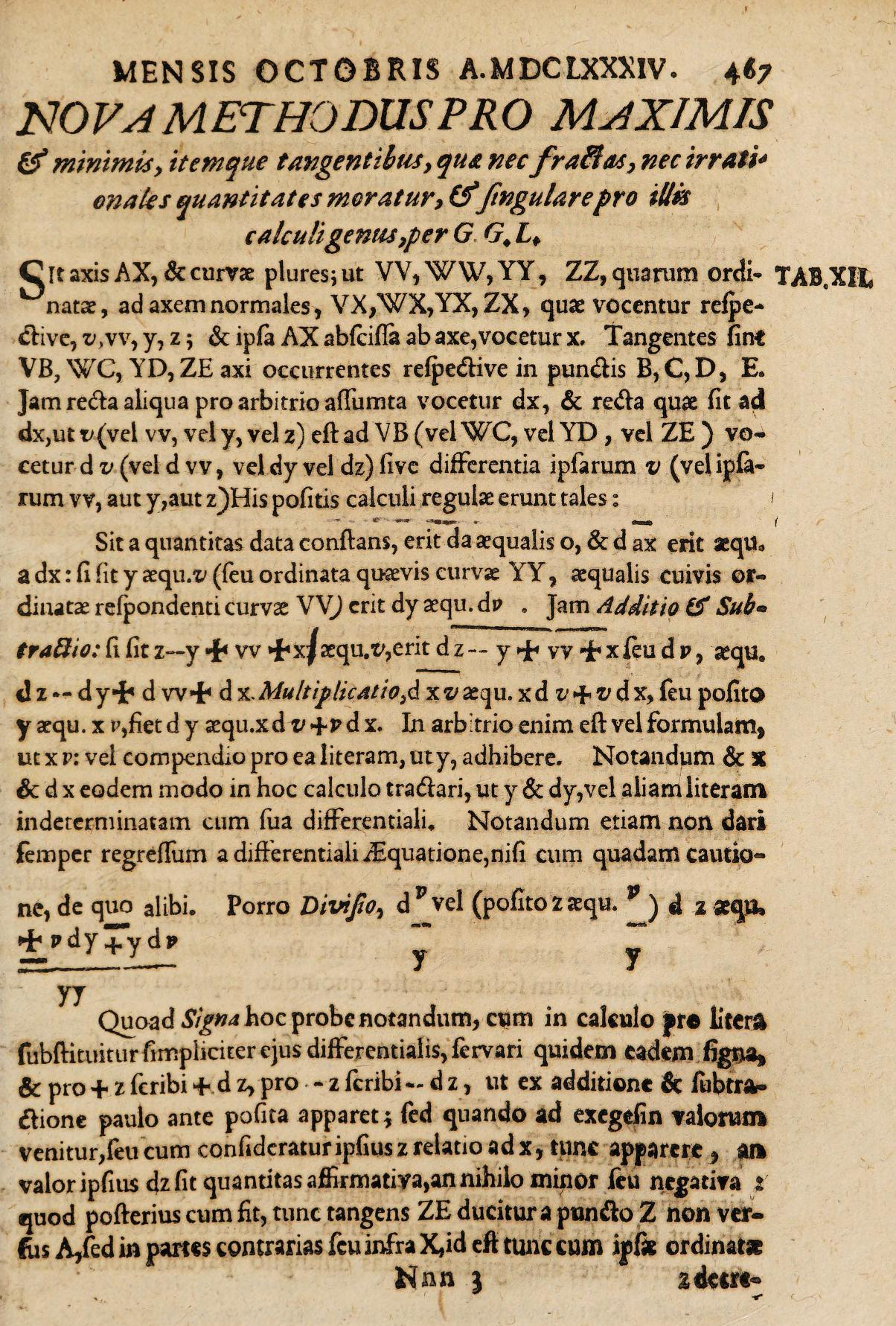
First page of the "Nova Methodus pro Maximis et Minimis", Acta Eruditorum, October 1684

"Nova Methodus pro Maximis et Minimis" is the first published work on the subject of calculus, although Newton's earliest manuscript works on calculus date from 1665-1666, De analysi per aequationes numero terminorum infinitas from 1669 and Method of Fluxions from 1671 were created earlier. It was published by Gottfried Leibniz in the Acta Eruditorum in October 1684.

== Full title ==
The full title of the published work is "Nova methodus pro maximis et minimis, itemque tangentibus, quae nec fractas nec irrationales quantitates moratur, et singulare pro illis calculi genus." In English, the full title can be translated as "A new method for maxima and minima, and for tangents, that is not hindered by fractional or irrational quantities, and a singular kind of calculus for the above mentioned." It is from this title that this branch of mathematics takes the name calculus.

== Influence ==
Although calculus was developed earlier by Isaac Newton, most of the notation in modern calculus is from Leibniz. Leibniz's careful attention to his notation makes some believe that "his contribution to calculus was much more influential than Newton's."

== Citation and translations ==
- Leibniz, Gottfried (1684). "Nova Methodus pro Maximis et Minimis". Acta Eruditorum (in Latin). 3: 467–473. Figures Tab. XII.
- Leibniz, Gottfried (1768). "Nova Methodus pro Maximis et Minimis". In Dutens, Louis (ed.). Gothofredi Guillelmi Leibnitii Opera Omnia (in Latin). Vol. 3. Geneva: Fratres de Tournes. pp. 167–172. Figures Tab. VI.
- Struik, Dirk J., ed. (1969). "A New Method for Maxima and Minima". A Source Book in Mathematics, 1200-1800. Harvard University Press. pp. 272–280.
- Bruce, Ian, ed. (2014). "A New Method for Finding Maxima and Minima" (PDF). 17centurymaths.com. Archived from the original (PDF) on 2023-05-21.

== See also ==
- Leibniz–Newton calculus controversy
