= Fluent (mathematics) =

Time-varying quantity or variable

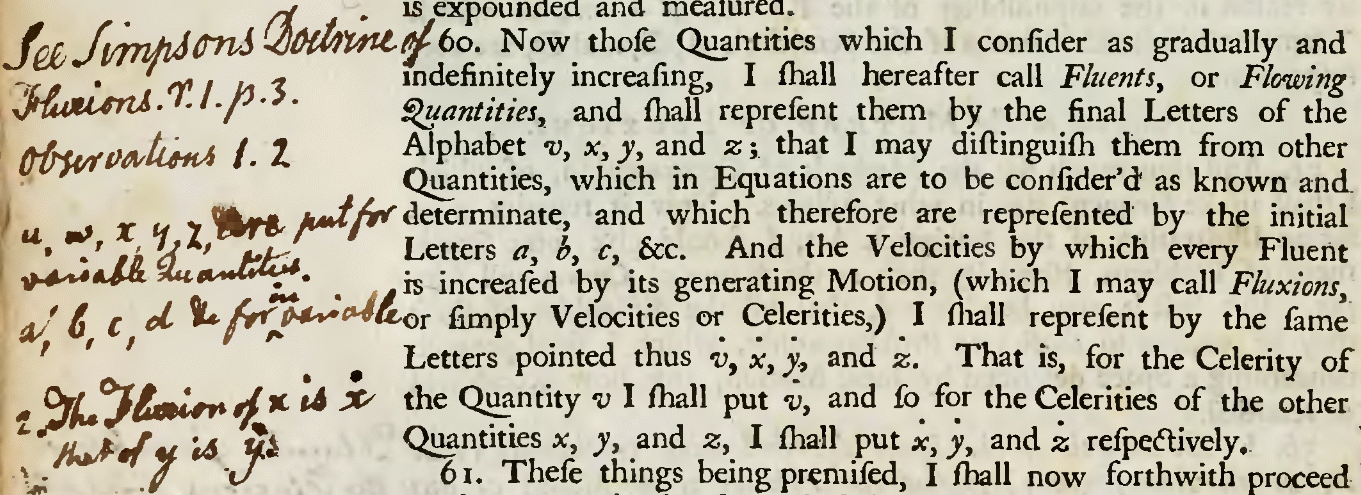
Newton's introduction of the notions "fluent" and "fluxion" in his 1736 book

A fluent is a time-varying quantity or variable. The term was used by Isaac Newton in his early calculus to describe his form of a function. The concept was introduced by Newton in 1665 and detailed in his mathematical treatise, Method of Fluxions. Newton described any variable that changed its value as a fluent – for example, the velocity of a ball thrown in the air. The derivative of a fluent is known as a fluxion, the main focus of Newton's calculus. A fluent can be found from its corresponding fluxion through integration.

The terms fluent and fluxion were used in 1878 by W. K. Clifford in Elements of Dynamic: "a quantity must be continuous to be fluent, must therefore be specified either by a line or an angle (which may be placed at the centre of a standard circle and measured by its arc) and rate of change of a length measured on a straight line or circle means velocity of one end of it (if the other be still) or difference of velocity of the two ends."(page 63) He then derives the product rule (page 64) and quotient rule (page 65).

== See also ==
- Method of Fluxions
- History of calculus
- Leibniz–Newton calculus controversy
- Derivative
- Newton's notation
- Fluxion
