= List of definite integrals =

In mathematics, the definite integral

$$\int_a^b f(x)\, dx$$

is the area of the region in the xy-plane bounded by the graph of f, the x-axis, and the lines x = a and x = b, such that area above the x-axis adds to the total, and that below the x-axis subtracts from the total.

The fundamental theorem of calculus establishes the relationship between indefinite and definite integrals and introduces a technique for evaluating definite integrals.

If the interval is infinite the definite integral is called an improper integral and defined by using appropriate limiting procedures. for example:

$$\int_a^\infty f(x)\, dx=\lim_{b\to\infty}\left[\int_a^b f(x)\, dx\right]$$

A constant, such pi, that may be defined by the integral of an algebraic function over an algebraic domain is known as a period.

The following is a list of some of the most common or interesting definite integrals. For a list of indefinite integrals see List of indefinite integrals.

== Definite integrals involving rational or irrational expressions ==
$$\int_0^\infty \frac{dx}{1+x^p}=\frac{\pi/p}{\sin(\pi/p)}\quad \text{for } \Re(p)>1$$
$$\int_0^\infty \frac{dx}{a^p + x^p}=\frac{\pi}{p a^{p-1}\sin{(\frac{\pi}{p}})} \quad \text{for } \Re(p)>1 \text{, } \Re(a)>0$$
$$\int_0^\infty \frac{x^{p-1}dx}{1+x}=\frac{\pi}{\sin(p\pi)}\quad \text{for } 0<p<1$$
$$\int_0^\infty \frac{x^{m}dx}{x^{n}+a^{n}}=\frac{\pi a^{m-n+1}}{n\sin\left(\dfrac{m+1}{n}\pi\right)}\quad \text{for } 0<m+1<n$$
$$\int_0^\infty \frac{x^m dx}{1+2x\cos\beta+x^{2}}=\frac{\pi}{\sin(m\pi)}\cdot\frac{\sin(m\beta)}{\sin(\beta)}$$
$$\int_0^a \frac{dx}{\sqrt{a^2-x^2}}=\frac{\pi}{2}$$
$$\int_0^a \sqrt{a^2-x^2}dx=\frac{\pi a^2}{4}$$
$$\int_0^a x^m (a^n-x^n)^p\,dx=\frac{a^{m+1+np}\Gamma\left(\dfrac{m+1}{n}\right)\Gamma(p+1)}{n\Gamma \left(\dfrac{m+1}{n}+p+1\right)}$$
$$\int_0^\infty \frac{x^m dx}{({x^n+a^n)}^r}=\frac{(-1)^{r-1}\pi a^{m+1-nr}\Gamma\left(\dfrac{m+1}{n}\right)}{n\sin\left(\dfrac{m+1}{n}\pi\right)(r-1)!\,\Gamma \left(\dfrac{m+1}{n}-r+1\right)}\quad \text{for } n(r-2)<m+1<nr$$

== Definite integrals involving trigonometric functions ==
$$\int_0^\pi \sin(mx)\sin(nx)dx=\begin{cases}
0 & \text{if } m\ne n \\ \\
\dfrac{\pi}{2} & \text{if } m=n
\end{cases}
\quad\text{for } m,n \text{ positive integers}$$
$$\int_0^\pi \cos(mx)\cos(nx)dx=\begin{cases}
0 & \text{if } m\ne n \\ \\
\dfrac{\pi}{2} & \text{if } m=n
\end{cases}
\quad\text{for } m,n \text{ positive integers}$$
$$\int_0^\pi \sin(mx)\cos(nx)dx=\begin{cases}
0 & \text{if } m+n \text{ even} \\ \\
\dfrac{2m}{m^{2}-n^{2}} & \text{if } m+n \text{ odd}
\end{cases}
\quad\text{for } m,n \text{ integers}.$$
$$\int_0^{\frac{\pi}{2}}\sin^2(x)dx=\int_0^{\frac{\pi}{2}}\cos^2(x)dx=\frac{\pi}{4}$$
$$\int_0^{\frac{\pi}{2}}\sin^{2m}(x)dx=\int_0^{\frac{\pi}{2}}\cos^{2m}(x)dx = \frac{1\times3\times5\times\cdots\times(2m-1)}{2\times4\times6\times\cdots\times2m}\cdot\frac{\pi}{2}\quad\text{for }m=1,2,3\ldots$$
$$\int_0^{x}\sin^{2m}(t)dt=\frac{(2m-1)!!}{(2m)!!}\Biggl(x-\sin(x)\cos(x)\Biggl(1+\sum_{k=1}^\infty\frac{\sin^{2k}(x)(2k)!!}{(2k+1)!!}\Biggr)\Biggr)\quad\text{for }m=1,2,3\ldots$$
$$\int_0^{x}\cos^{2m}(t)dt=\frac{(2m-1)!!}{(2m)!!}\Biggl(x-\sin(x)\cos(x)\Biggl(1+\sum_{k=1}^\infty\frac{\cos^{2k}(x)(2k)!!}{(2k+1)!!}\Biggr)\Biggr)\quad\text{for }m=1,2,3\ldots$$
$$\int_0^{\frac{\pi}{2}}\sin^{2m+1}(x)dx=\int_0^{\frac{\pi}{2}}\cos^{2m+1}(x)dx = \frac{2\times4\times6\times\cdots\times2m}{1\times3\times5\times\cdots\times(2m+1)}\quad\text{for }m=1,2,3\ldots$$
$$\int_0^{\frac{\pi}{2}}\sin^{2p-1}(x)\cos^{2q-1}(x)dx = \frac{\Gamma(p)\Gamma(q)}{2\Gamma(p+q)}=\frac{1}{2} \text{B}(p,q)$$
$$\int_0^\infty \frac{\sin(px)}{x}dx=\begin{cases}
\dfrac{\pi}{2} & \text{if } p>0 \\
\\
0 & \text{if } p=0 \\
\\
-\dfrac{\pi}{2} & \text {if } p<0
\end{cases}$$
(see Dirichlet integral)
$$\int_{0}^{\infty }\frac{\sin px\cos qx}{x}\ dx=\begin{cases}
0 & \text{ if } q>p>0 \\
\\
\dfrac{\pi}{2}& \text{ if } 0<q<p \\
\\
\dfrac{\pi}{4} & \text{ if } p=q>0
\end{cases}$$
$$\int_{0}^{\infty }\frac{\sin px \sin qx}{x^{2}}\ dx=\begin{cases}
\dfrac{\pi p}{2}& \text{ if } 0<p\leq q \\
\\
\dfrac{\pi q}{2} & \text{ if } 0<q\leq p
\end{cases}$$
$$\int_{0}^{\infty} \frac{\sin ^{2}px}{x^{2}}\ dx=\frac{\pi p}{2}$$
$$\int_{0}^{\infty} \frac{1-\cos px}{x^{2}}\ dx=\frac{\pi p}{2}$$
$$\int_{0}^{\infty} \frac{\cos px - \cos qx}{x}\ dx= \ln \frac {q}{p}$$
$$\int_{0}^{\infty} \frac{\cos px - \cos qx}{x^{2}}\ dx=\frac{\pi (q-p)}{2}$$
$$\int_{0}^{\infty} \frac{\cos mx}{x^{2}+a^{2}}\ dx=\frac{\pi}{2a}e^{-ma}$$
$$\int_0^\infty \frac{x \sin mx}{x^2+a^2}\ dx=\frac{\pi}{2}e^{-ma}$$
$$\int_0^\infty \frac{ \sin mx}{x(x^2+a^2)}\ dx=\frac{\pi}{2a^2}\left(1-e^{-ma}\right)$$
$$\int_0^{2\pi} \frac{dx}{a+b\sin x}=\frac{2\pi}{\sqrt{a^2-b^2}}$$
$$\int_0^{2\pi} \frac{dx}{a+b\cos x}=\frac{2\pi}{\sqrt{a^2-b^2}}$$
$$\int_0^{\frac{\pi}{2}} \frac{dx}{a+b\cos x}=\frac{\cos^{-1} \left(\dfrac{b}{a}\right) }{\sqrt{a^2-b^2}}$$
$$\int_0^{2\pi} \frac{dx}{(a+b\sin x)^2}=\int_0^{2\pi} \frac{dx}{(a+b\cos x)^2}=\frac{2\pi a}{(a^2-b^2)^{3/2}}$$
$$\int_0^{2\pi} \frac{dx}{1-2a\cos x +a^2}=\frac{2\pi}{1-a^2} \quad \text{for } 0<a<1$$
$$\int_0^{\pi} \frac{x \sin x\ dx}{1-2a\cos x +a^2}=\begin{cases}
\dfrac{\pi}{a}\ln\left|1+a\right| & \text{if } |a|<1 \\ \\
\dfrac{\pi}{a} \ln\left|1+\dfrac{1}{a}\right| & \text{if } |a|>1
\end{cases}$$
$$\int_0^{\pi} \frac{\cos mx\ dx}{1-2a\cos x +a^2}=\frac{\pi a^m}{1-a^2} \quad \text{for } a^2<1\ , \ m=0,1,2,\dots$$
$$\int_0^\infty \sin ax^2\ dx=\int_0^\infty \cos ax^2= \frac{1}{2}\sqrt \frac{\pi}{2a}$$
$$\int_0^\infty \sin ax^n\ dx=\frac{1}{na^{1/n}}\Gamma\left(\frac{1}{n}\right)\sin\frac{\pi}{2n} \quad \text{for } n>1$$
$$\int_0^\infty \cos ax^n\ dx=\frac{1}{na^{1/n}}\Gamma\left(\frac{1}{n}\right)\cos\frac{\pi}{2n} \quad \text{for } n>1$$
$$\int_0^\infty \frac{\sin x}{\sqrt x}\ dx=\int_0^\infty \frac{\cos x}{\sqrt x}\ dx=\sqrt{\frac{\pi}{2}}$$
$$\int_0^\infty \frac{\sin x}{x^p}\ dx= \frac{\pi}{2\Gamma(p)\sin \left(\dfrac{p\pi}{2}\right)} \quad \text{for } 0 < p < 1$$
$$\int_0^\infty \frac{\cos x}{x^p}\ dx= \frac{\pi}{2\Gamma(p)\cos \left(\dfrac{p\pi}{2}\right)} \quad \text{for } 0 < p < 1$$
$$\int_0^\infty \sin ax^2\cos 2bx\ dx=\frac{1}{2}\sqrt{\frac{\pi}{2a}}\left(\cos \frac{b^2}{a}-\sin\frac{b^2}{a}\right)$$
$$\int_0^\infty \cos ax^2\cos 2bx\ dx=\frac{1}{2}\sqrt{\frac{\pi}{2a}}\left(\cos \frac{b^2}{a}+\sin\frac{b^2}{a}\right)$$

== Definite integrals involving exponential functions ==
$\int_0^\infty \sqrt{x}\,e^{-x}\,dx = \frac{1}{2}\sqrt \pi$ (see also Gamma function)
$$\int_0^\infty e^{-ax}\cos bx \, dx=\frac{a}{a^2+b^2}$$
$$\int_0^\infty e^{-ax}\sin bx \, dx=\frac{b}{a^{2}+b^{2}}$$
$$\int_0^\infty \frac {{}e^{-ax}\sin bx}{x} \, dx=\tan^{-1}\frac{b}{a}$$
$$\int_0^\infty \frac {e^{-ax}-e^{-bx}}{x} \, dx=\ln \frac{b}{a}$$
$$\int_0^\infty \frac {e^{-ax}-\cos(bx)}{x} \, dx=\ln \frac{b}{a}$$
$\int_0^\infty e^{-a x^2}\,dx = \frac{1}{2} \sqrt \frac {\pi} {a} \quad \text{for } a>0$ (the Gaussian integral)
$$\int_0^\infty {e^{-ax^{2}}}\cos bx\, dx=\frac {1}{2} \sqrt{\frac{\pi}{a}}e^\left(\frac{-b^2}{4a}\right)$$
$$\int_0^\infty e^{-(ax^{2}+bx+c)}\, dx=\frac{1}{2}\sqrt{\frac{\pi}{a}}e^\left(\frac{b^2-4ac}{4a}\right)\cdot \operatorname{erfc} \frac{b}{2\sqrt{a}},\text{ where }\operatorname{erfc}(p)=\frac{2}{\sqrt{\pi}}\int_p^\infty  e^{-x^{2}}\, dx$$
$$\int_{-\infty}^{\infty} e^{-(ax^{2}+bx+c)}\ dx=\sqrt {\frac{\pi}{a}}e^\left(\frac{b^2-4ac}{4a}\right)$$
$$\int_0^\infty x^{n}e^{-ax}\ dx=\frac{\Gamma (n+1)}{a^{n+1}}$$
$$\int_0^\infty{x^2 e^{-a x^2}\,dx} = \frac{1}{4} \sqrt \frac {\pi} {a^3} \quad \text{for } a>0$$
$\int_0^\infty x^{2n} e^{-a x^2}\,dx = \frac{2n-1}{2a} \int_0^\infty x^{2(n-1)} e^{-a x^2}\,dx = \frac{(2n-1)!!}{2^{n+1}} \sqrt{\frac{\pi}{a^{2n+1}}} = \frac{(2n)!}{n! 2^{2n+1}} \sqrt{\frac{\pi}{a^{2n+1}}} \quad \text{for } a>0\ ,\ n=1,2,3\ldots$ (where !! is the double factorial)
$$\int_0^\infty{x^3 e^{-a x^2}\,dx} = \frac{1}{2 a^2} \quad \text{for } a>0$$
$$\int_0^\infty x^{2n+1} e^{-a x^2}\,dx
= \frac {n} {a} \int_0^\infty x^{2n-1} e^{-a x^2}\,dx
= \frac{n!}{2 a^{n+1}} \quad \text{for } a>0\ ,\ n=0,1,2\ldots$$
$$\int_0^\infty x^m e^{-ax^2}\ dx=\frac{\Gamma\left(\dfrac{m+1}{2}\right)}{2a^\left(\frac{m+1}{2}\right)}$$
$$\int_0^\infty x^n e^{-ax^b} dx = \frac{1}{b}\ a^{-\frac{n+1}{b}}\Gamma\left(\frac{n+1}{b}\right)$$
$$\int_0^\infty e^{\left(-ax^2-\frac{b}{x^2}\right)}\ dx=\frac{1}{2} \sqrt \frac{\pi}{a}e^{-2 \sqrt{ab}}$$
$$\int_0^\infty \frac {x}{e^x-1}\ dx=\zeta (2)= \frac {\pi^2}{6}$$
$$\int_0^\infty \frac {x^{n-1}}{e^x-1}\ dx=\Gamma (n)\zeta (n)$$
$$\int_0^\infty \frac {x}{e^x+1}\ dx=\frac{1}{1^2}-\frac{1}{2^2}+\frac{1}{3^2}-\frac{1}{4^2}+\dots=\frac{\pi^2}{12}$$
$$\int_0^\infty \frac {x^n}{e^x+1}\ dx= n! \cdot \left( \frac{2^n-1}{2^n} \right) \zeta(n+1)$$
$$\int_0^\infty \frac {\sin mx}{e^{2\pi x}-1}\ dx=\frac{1}{4} \coth\frac{m}{2}- \frac{1}{2m}$$
$\int_0^\infty \left(\frac {1}{1+x}- e^{-x}\right)\ \frac{dx}{x}=\gamma$ (where $\gamma$ is Euler–Mascheroni constant)
$$\int_0^\infty \frac {e^{-x^2}-e^{-x}}{x}\ dx=\frac{\gamma}{2}$$
$$\int_0^\infty \left(\frac {1}{e^x-1}-\frac{e^{-x}}{x}\right)\ dx=\gamma$$
$$\int_0^\infty \frac {e^{-ax}-e^{-bx}}{x \sec px}\ dx=\frac{1}{2} \ln\frac{b^2+p^2}{a^2+p^2}$$
$$\int_0^\infty \frac {e^{-ax}-e^{-bx}}{x \csc px}\ dx=\tan^{-1}\frac{b}{p}-\tan^{-1}\frac{a}{p}$$
$$\int_0^\infty \frac {e^{-ax}(1-\cos x)}{x^2}\ dx=\cot^{-1} a-\frac{a}{2}\ln\left|\frac{a^2+1}{a^2}\right|$$
$$\int_{-\infty}^\infty e^{-x^2}\,dx=\sqrt{\pi}$$
$$\int_{-\infty}^\infty x^{2(n+1)}e^{-\frac12 x^2}\,dx=\frac{(2n+1)!}{2^n n!}\sqrt{2 \pi} \quad\text{for } n=0,1,2,\ldots$$

== Definite integrals involving logarithmic functions ==
$$\int_0^1 x^m (\ln x)^n \, dx=\frac{(-1)^n n!}{(m+1)^{n+1}} \quad\text{for } m>-1, n=0,1,2,\ldots$$
$$\int_1^\infty x^m (\ln x)^n \, dx=\frac{(-1)^{n + 1} n!}{(m+1)^{n+1}} \quad\text{for } m<-1, n=0,1,2,\ldots$$
$$\int_0^1 \frac{\ln x}{1+x}\, dx= -\frac{\pi^2}{12}$$
$$\int_0^1 \frac{\ln x}{1-x}\, dx= -\frac{\pi^2}{6}$$
$$\int_0^1 \frac{\ln (1+x)}{x}\, dx= \frac{\pi^2}{12}$$
$$\int_0^1 \frac{\ln (1-x)}{x}\, dx= -\frac{\pi^2}{6}$$
$$\int_0^\infty \frac{\ln(a^{2}+x^{2})}{b^{2}+x^{2}}\ dx = \frac{\pi}{b} \ln (a+b)\quad\text{for } a,b>0$$
$$\int_0^\infty\frac{\ln x}{x^2+a^2}\ dx = \frac{\pi \ln a}{2a}\quad\text{for } a>0$$

== Definite integrals involving hyperbolic functions ==
$$\int_0^\infty \frac{\sin ax}{\sinh bx}\ dx=\frac {\pi}{2b}\tanh \frac{a \pi}{2b}$$

$$\int_0^\infty \frac{\cos ax}{\cosh bx}\ dx=\frac {\pi}{2b}\cdot\frac{1}{\cosh \frac{a \pi}{2b}}$$

$$\int_0^\infty \frac{x}{\sinh ax}\ dx=\frac{\pi^2}{4a^2}$$

$$\int_0^\infty \frac{x^{2n+1}}{\sinh ax}\ dx= c_{2n+1} \left( \frac{\pi}{a} \right)^{2(n+1)}, \quad c_{2n+1} = \frac{(-1)^n}{2} \left(\frac{1}{2}- \sum_{k=0}^{n-1} (-1)^k {2n+1 \choose 2k+1} c_{2k+1} \right), \quad c_1 = \frac{1}{4}$$

$$\int_{0}^\infty \frac{1}{\cosh ax}\ dx = \frac{\pi}{2a}$$

$$\int_0^\infty \frac{x^{2n}}{\cosh ax}\ dx= d_{2n} \left( \frac{\pi}{a} \right)^{2n+1}, \quad d_{2n} = \frac{(-1)^n}{2} \left(\frac{1}{4^n}- \sum_{k=0}^{n-1} (-1)^k {2n \choose 2k} d_{2k} \right), \quad d_0 = \frac{1}{2}$$

== Frullani integrals ==
$$\int_{0}^{\infty }\frac{f(ax)-f(bx)}{x}\ dx=\left(\lim_{x \to 0}f(x)-\lim_{x \to \infty}f(x)\right) \ln \left(\frac{b}{a} \right)$$
holds if the integral exists and $f'(x)$ is continuous.

== See also ==
- List of integrals
- Indefinite sum
- Gamma function
- List of limits
