= Leibniz–Newton calculus controversy =

Public dispute between Isaac Newton and Gottfried Leibniz (beginning 1699)

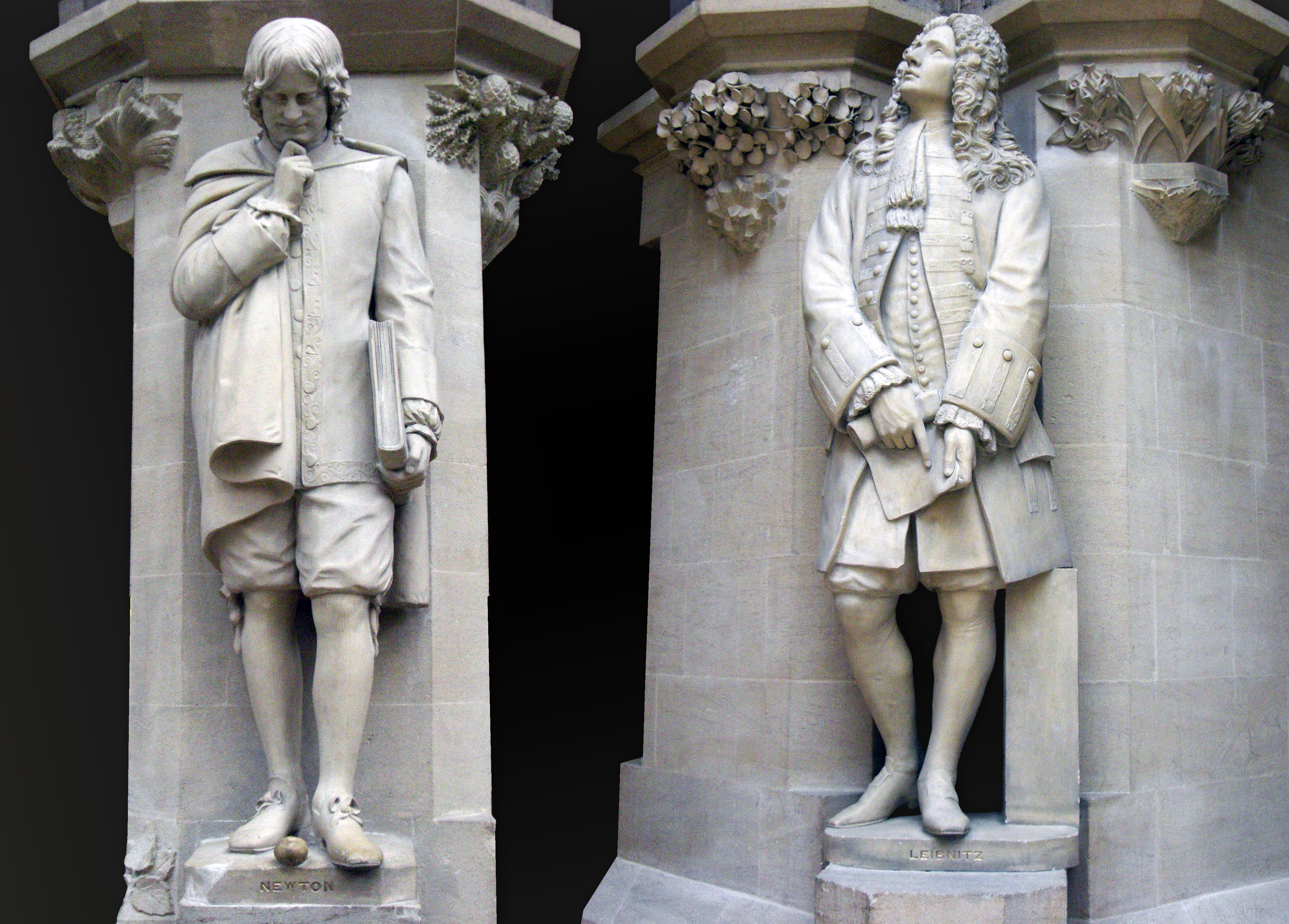
Statues of Isaac Newton and Gottfried Wilhelm Leibniz in the courtyard of the Oxford University Museum of Natural History, collage

In the history of calculus, the calculus controversy was a priority dispute (German: Prioritätsstreit) between mathematicians Isaac Newton and Gottfried Wilhelm Leibniz over who had first invented calculus. The question was a major intellectual controversy, beginning in 1699 and reaching its peak in 1712. Leibniz had published his work on calculus first (having learned the rudiments from Erhard Weigel starting in 1663), but Newton's supporters accused Leibniz of plagiarizing Newton's unpublished ideas. The modern consensus is that the two men independently developed their ideas. Their creation of calculus has been called arguably "the greatest advance in mathematics that had taken place since the time of Archimedes."

Newton began working on a form of calculus, which he called "The Method of Fluxions and Infinite Series," in 1666 at the age of 23. Although a surviving manuscript from October 1666 records this early work, it was not published until decades later in 1737 as a minor annotation in the back of one of his works. He further developed his ideas in On Analysis by Equations with an infinite number of terms, written in 1669, and Method of Fluxions, written in 1671. Gottfried Leibniz began developing his own variant of calculus in 1674 and published his first paper on the subject, "Nova Methodus pro Maximis et Minimis," in 1684. In 1696, Guillaume de l'Hôpital published a text on Leibnizian calculus, in which he recognized that Newton's Principia of 1687 was "nearly all about this calculus." Meanwhile, Newton had presented a geometrical form of calculus in Section I of Book I of the Principia of 1687, but did not publish his eventual fluxional notation for the calculus in print until 1693 in partial form and 1704 more fully.

Today, the consensus is that Leibniz and Newton independently invented and described calculus in Europe in the 17th century. Their work was noted to be more than just a "synthesis of previously distinct pieces of mathematical technique, but it was certainly this in part".

It was certainly Isaac Newton who first devised a new infinitesimal calculus and elaborated it into a widely extensible algorithm, whose potentialities he fully understood; of equal certainty, differential and integral calculus, the fount of great developments flowing continuously from 1684 to the present day, was created independently by Gottfried Leibniz.

— Hall 1980: 1

One author has identified the dispute as being about "profoundly different" methods:

Despite ... points of resemblance, the methods [of Newton and Leibniz] are profoundly different, so making the priority row a nonsense.

— Grattan-Guinness 1997: 247

On the other hand, other authors have emphasized the equivalences and mutual translatability of the methods; here Niccolò Guicciardini (2003) appears to confirm L'Hôpital (1696) (already cited):

the Newtonian and Leibnizian schools shared a common mathematical method. They adopted two algorithms, the analytical method of fluxions, and the differential and integral calculus, which were translatable one into the other.

— Guicciardini 2003, on page 250

== Scientific priority in the 17th century ==
In the 17th century, the question of scientific priority was of great importance to scientists; however, during this period, scientific journals had only just begun to appear, and a generally accepted mechanism for establishing priority when publishing discoveries had not yet formed. Among the methods used by scientists were anagrams, sealed envelopes placed in safekeeping, correspondence with other scientists, or private messages. For a French scientist, a letter to Marin Mersenne (the founder of the French Academy of Sciences), or for an English scientist, a letter to Henry Oldenburg (the secretary of the Royal Society of London), essentially carried the status of a published article. The discoverer could "time-stamp" the moment of his discovery and prove that he knew of it at the point the letter was sealed, demonstrating that it had not been copied from anything subsequently published. Nevertheless, if an idea was later published alongside its use in a particularly valuable context, this might take priority over an earlier discoverer's work that had no obvious application. Further, a mathematician's claim could be undermined by counter-claims that he had not truly invented an idea but merely improved on someone else's work—an improvement requiring little skill and based on facts that were already known.

A series of high-profile disputes about scientific priority in the 17th century—an era that the American science historian D. Meli called "the golden age of the mud-slinging priority disputes"—is associated with Leibniz. The first of these occurred at the beginning of 1673 during his first visit to London, when in the presence of the famous mathematician John Pell, he presented his method of approximating series by differences. When Pell remarked that this discovery had already been made by François Regnaud and published in 1670 in Lyon by Gabriel Mouton, Leibniz answered the next day. In a letter to Oldenburg, he wrote that after reviewing Mouton's book, he acknowledged that Pell was correct, but he added that he could provide his draft notes containing nuances not found by Regnaud and Mouton. Thus, the integrity of Leibniz was proven, though this case was recalled later.

During the same visit to London, Leibniz found himself in the opposite position. On 1 February 1673, at a meeting of the Royal Society of London, he demonstrated his mechanical calculator. The Society's curator of experiments, Robert Hooke, carefully examined the device and even removed the back cover. A few days later, in the absence of Leibniz, Hooke criticized the German scientist's machine, claiming he could make a simpler model. Leibniz, who learned about this after returning to Paris, categorically rejected Hooke's claim in a letter to Oldenburg and formulated principles of correct scientific behavior: "We know that respectable and modest people prefer it when they think of something that is consistent with what someone else discovered, to ascribe their own improvements and additions to the discoverer, so as not to arouse suspicions of intellectual dishonesty; the desire for true generosity should pursue them, instead of the lying thirst for dishonest profit." To illustrate proper behavior, Leibniz gave the examples of Nicolas-Claude Fabri de Peiresc and Pierre Gassendi, who performed astronomical observations similar to those made earlier by Galileo Galilei and Johannes Hevelius, respectively. Learning they did not make their discoveries first, the French scientists passed their data on to the original discoverers.

Newton's approach to priority disputes can be illustrated by his discovery of the inverse-square law as applied to the dynamics of bodies moving under the influence of gravity. Based on an analysis of Kepler's laws and his own calculations, Robert Hooke postulated that motion under such conditions should occur along elliptical orbits. Unable to rigorously prove this claim, he reported it to Newton. Without entering into further correspondence with Hooke, Newton solved the problem as well as its inverse, proving that the law of inverse squares follows from the ellipticity of orbits. This discovery was set forth in his famous work Philosophiæ Naturalis Principia Mathematica without mentioning Hooke. At the insistence of astronomer Edmond Halley, to whom the manuscript was handed over for editing and publication, a phrase was included stating that the compliance of Kepler's first law with the law of inverse squares was "independently approved by Wren, Hooke and Halley."

According to a remark by Vladimir Arnold, when choosing between refusing to publish his discoveries and a constant struggle for priority, Newton chose both.

== Background ==
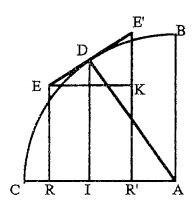
Pascal's differential triangle

By the time of Newton and Leibniz, European mathematicians had already made significant contributions to the formation of mathematical analysis. The Dutchman Simon Stevin (1548–1620), the Italian Luca Valerio (1553–1618), and the German Johannes Kepler (1571–1630) were engaged in developing the ancient "method of exhaustion" for calculating areas and volumes. Kepler's ideas apparently influenced—either directly or through Galileo Galilei—the "method of indivisibles" developed by Bonaventura Cavalieri (1598–1647).

The last years of Leibniz's life (1710–1716) were embittered by a long controversy with John Keill, Newton, and others over whether Leibniz had discovered calculus independently of Newton, or whether he had merely invented another notation for ideas that were fundamentally Newton's. No participant doubted that Newton had already developed his method of fluxions when Leibniz began working on the differential calculus, yet there was seemingly no proof beyond Newton's word. Newton had published a calculation of a tangent with the note: "This is only a special case of a general method whereby I can calculate curves and determine maxima, minima, and centers of gravity." How this was done he explained to a pupil 20 years later, when Leibniz's articles were already widely read. Newton's manuscripts came to light only after his death.

The infinitesimal calculus can be expressed either in the notation of fluxions or in that of differentials; alternatively, as noted above, it was also expressed by Newton in geometrical form, as in the Principia of 1687. Newton employed fluxions as early as 1666, but did not publish an account of his notation until 1693. The earliest use of differentials in Leibniz's notebooks can be traced to 1675. He employed this notation in a 1677 letter to Newton, and it also appeared in Leibniz's memoir of 1684.

Differences in notation
	Newton	Leibniz
Function	$f(x)$	$y$
Differentiation	$\dot y$ or $f'(x)$	${dy \over dx}$ or $\frac{\Delta y}{\Delta x}$
Integration	$\bar{x}$ or $$\begin{bmatrix} x \\  \end{bmatrix}$$	$\int\limits_{a}^{b} f(x)dx$

The claim that Leibniz invented calculus independently of Newton rests on the basis that Leibniz:

1. Published a description of his method some years before Newton printed anything on fluxions;
2. Always alluded to the discovery as being his own invention (a statement that went unchallenged for some years);
3. Enjoyed the strong presumption that he acted in good faith;
4. Demonstrated in his private papers his development of the ideas of calculus in a manner independent of the path taken by Newton.

According to Leibniz's detractors, the fact that Leibniz's claim went unchallenged for some years is immaterial. To rebut his case, it is sufficient to show that he:

- Saw some of Newton's papers on the subject in or before 1675, or at least by 1677;
- Obtained the fundamental ideas of calculus from those papers.

No attempt was made to rebut point #4, which was unknown at the time but provides the strongest evidence that Leibniz arrived at calculus independently of Newton. This evidence, however, remains questionable based on discoveries made during the inquest and afterward that Leibniz both back-dated and altered the fundamentals of his "original" notes, not only in this intellectual conflict but in several others. He also published anonymous slanders of Newton regarding their controversy, authorship of which he initially tried to deny.

If good faith is nevertheless assumed, Leibniz's notes as presented to the inquest arrived first at integration, which he saw as a generalization of the summation of infinite series, whereas Newton began from derivatives. However, viewing the development of calculus as entirely independent between the two men overlooks the fact that both had some knowledge of the other's methods (though Newton did develop most fundamentals before Leibniz began) and collaborated on a few aspects, particularly power series. This is shown in a letter to Henry Oldenburg dated 24 October 1676, where Newton remarks that Leibniz had developed a number of methods, one of which was new to him. Both Leibniz and Newton could see that the other was far along toward inventing calculus (Leibniz explicitly mentions it), but only Leibniz was prodded by this realization into publication.

That Leibniz saw some of Newton's manuscripts had always been likely. In 1849, C. I. Gerhardt, while going through Leibniz's manuscripts, found extracts from Newton's De Analysi per Equationes Numero Terminorum Infinitas in Leibniz's handwriting. Its existence had been previously unsuspected, along with notes re-expressing the content of these extracts in Leibniz's differential notation. (The work was published in 1704 as part of the De Quadratura Curvarum but had previously circulated among mathematicians, beginning when Newton gave a copy to Isaac Barrow in 1669, who then sent it to John Collins.)

Hence, when these extracts were made becomes all-important. It is known that a copy of Newton's manuscript had been sent to Ehrenfried Walther von Tschirnhaus in May 1675, a time when he and Leibniz were collaborating; it is not impossible that these extracts were made then. It is also possible that they were made in 1676, when Leibniz discussed analysis by infinite series with Collins and Oldenburg. It is probable that they would have shown him Newton's manuscript on the subject, a copy of which one or both of them surely possessed. On the other hand, it may be supposed that Leibniz made the extracts from the printed copy in or after 1704. Shortly before his death, Leibniz admitted in a letter to Abbé Antonio Schinella Conti that in 1676 Collins had shown him some of Newton's papers, but Leibniz implied they were of little or no value. Presumably, he was referring to Newton's letters of 13 June and 24 October 1676, and to the letter of 10 December 1672 on the method of tangents, extracts from which accompanied the letter of 13 June.

Whether Leibniz made use of the manuscript from which he had copied extracts, or whether he had previously invented the calculus, are questions for which no direct evidence is currently available. It is, however, worth noting that the unpublished Portsmouth Papers show that when Newton entered into the dispute in 1711, he picked this manuscript as the one that had likely fallen into Leibniz's hands. At that time, there was no direct evidence that Leibniz had seen Newton's manuscript before it was printed in 1704; hence, Newton's conjecture was not published. But Gerhardt's discovery of a copy made by Leibniz appears to confirm its accuracy. Those who question Leibniz's good faith allege that to a man of his ability, the manuscript, especially if supplemented by the letter of 10 December 1672, sufficed to give him a clue as to the methods of calculus, though some deny this.

== Development ==
The quarrel was a retrospective affair. In 1696, already some years after the events that became the subject of the dispute, the position still looked potentially peaceful: Newton and Leibniz had each made limited acknowledgments of the other's work, and L'Hôpital's 1696 book about calculus from a Leibnizian perspective had also acknowledged Newton's published work of the 1680s as "nearly all about this calculus" ("presque tout de ce calcul"), while expressing a preference for the convenience of Leibniz's notation.

At first, there was no reason to suspect Leibniz's good faith. In 1699, Nicolas Fatio de Duillier, a Swiss mathematician known for his work on the zodiacal light problem, publicly accused Leibniz of plagiarizing Newton, although he had privately accused Leibniz of plagiarism twice in letters to Christiaan Huygens in 1692. It was not until the 1704 publication of an anonymous review of Newton's tract on quadrature, which implied Newton had borrowed the idea of the fluxional calculus from Leibniz, that any responsible mathematician doubted Leibniz had invented calculus independently. With respect to the review of Newton's quadrature work, all admit there was no justification or authority for the statements made therein, which were rightly chess-moved to Leibniz. But the subsequent discussion led to a critical examination of the whole question, and doubts emerged: "Had Leibniz derived the fundamental idea of calculus from Newton?" The case against Leibniz, as it appeared to Newton's friends, was summed up in the Commercium Epistolicum of 1712, which referenced all allegations. This document was thoroughly engineered by Newton.

No such summary (with facts, dates, and references) of the case for Leibniz was issued by his friends; however, Johann Bernoulli attempted to indirectly weaken the evidence by attacking the personal character of Newton in a letter dated 7 June 1713. When pressed for an explanation, Bernoulli most solemnly denied having written the letter. In accepting the denial, Newton added in a private letter to Bernoulli the following remarks, detailing his reasons for taking part in the controversy: "I have never grasped at fame among foreign nations, but I am very desirous to preserve my character for honesty, which the author of that epistle, as if by the authority of a great judge, had endeavoured to wrest from me. Now that I am old, I have little pleasure in mathematical studies, and I have never tried to propagate my opinions over the world, but I have rather taken care not to involve myself in disputes on account of them."

Leibniz explained his silence as follows, in a letter to Conti dated 9 April 1716:

In order to respond point by point to all the work published against me, I would have to go into much minutiae that occurred thirty, forty years ago, of which I remember little: I would have to search my old letters, of which many are lost. Moreover, in most cases, I did not keep a copy, and when I did, the copy is buried in a great heap of papers, which I could sort through only with time and patience. I have enjoyed little leisure, being so weighted down of late with occupations of a totally different nature.

In any event, a bias favoring Newton tainted the whole affair from the outset. The Royal Society, of which Isaac Newton was president at the time, set up a committee to pronounce on the priority dispute in response to a letter it had received from Leibniz. That committee never asked Leibniz to give his version of events. The report of the committee, finding in favor of Newton, was written and published early in 1713 as the "Commercium Epistolicum" (mentioned above) by Newton himself. Leibniz, however, did not see it until the autumn of 1714.

=== Leibniz's death and end of dispute ===
Leibniz never agreed to acknowledge Newton's priority in inventing calculus. He attempted to write his own version of the history of differential calculus, but, as with his history of the rulers of Braunschweig, he never completed it. At the end of 1715, Leibniz accepted Johann Bernoulli's offer to organize another mathematical competition, in which different approaches would have to prove their worth. This time the problem was taken from the area later called the calculus of variations—it required constructing a tangent line to a family of curves. A letter was written on 25 November and transmitted in London to Newton through Abate Conti. The problem was formulated in unclear terms, and only later did it become evident that it required a general solution, rather than the particular one Newton had understood. After the British side published their decision, Leibniz published his own, more general solution, and thus formally won the competition.

For his part, Newton stubbornly sought to destroy his opponent. Not having achieved this with the "Report", he continued his research, spending hundreds of hours on it. His next study, entitled "Observations upon the preceding Epistle", was inspired by a letter from Leibniz to Conti in March 1716 that criticized Newton's philosophical views; no new facts were provided in this document.

== See also ==
- List of scientific priority disputes

== Sources ==
- Арнольд, В. И. (1989). Гюйгенс и Барроу, Ньютон и Гук - Первые шаги математического анализа и теории катастроф. М.: Наука. p. 98. ISBN 5-02-013935-1.
- Arnold, Vladimir (1990). Huygens and Barrow, Newton and Hooke: Pioneers in mathematical analysis and catastrophe theory from evolvents to quasicrystals. Translated by Primrose, Eric J.F. Birkhäuser Verlag. ISBN 3-7643-2383-3.
- W. W. Rouse Ball (1908) A Short Account of the History of Mathematics], 4th ed.
- Bardi, Jason Socrates (2006). The Calculus Wars: Newton, Leibniz, and the Greatest Mathematical Clash of All Time. New York: Thunder's Mouth Press. ISBN 978-1-56025-992-3.
- Boyer, C. B. (1949). The History of the Calculus and its conceptual development. Dover Publications, inc.
- Richard C. Brown (2012) Tangled origins of the Leibnitzian Calculus: A case study of mathematical revolution, World Scientific ISBN 9789814390804
- Ivor Grattan-Guinness (1997) The Norton History of the Mathematical Sciences. W W Norton.
- Hall, A. R. (1980). Philosophers at War: The Quarrel between Newton and Leibniz. Cambridge University Press. ISBN 0-521-22732-1.
- Stephen Hawking (1988) A Brief History of Time From the Big Bang to Black Holes. Bantam Books.
- Kandaswamy, Anand. The Newton/Leibniz Conflict in Context.
- Meli, D. B. (1993). Equivalence and Priority: Newton versus Leibniz: Including Leibniz's Unpublished Manuscripts on the Principia. Clarendon Press. p. 318. ISBN 0-19-850143-9.
