= Charles Hayes (mathematician) =

English mathematician, chronologist and slave trader

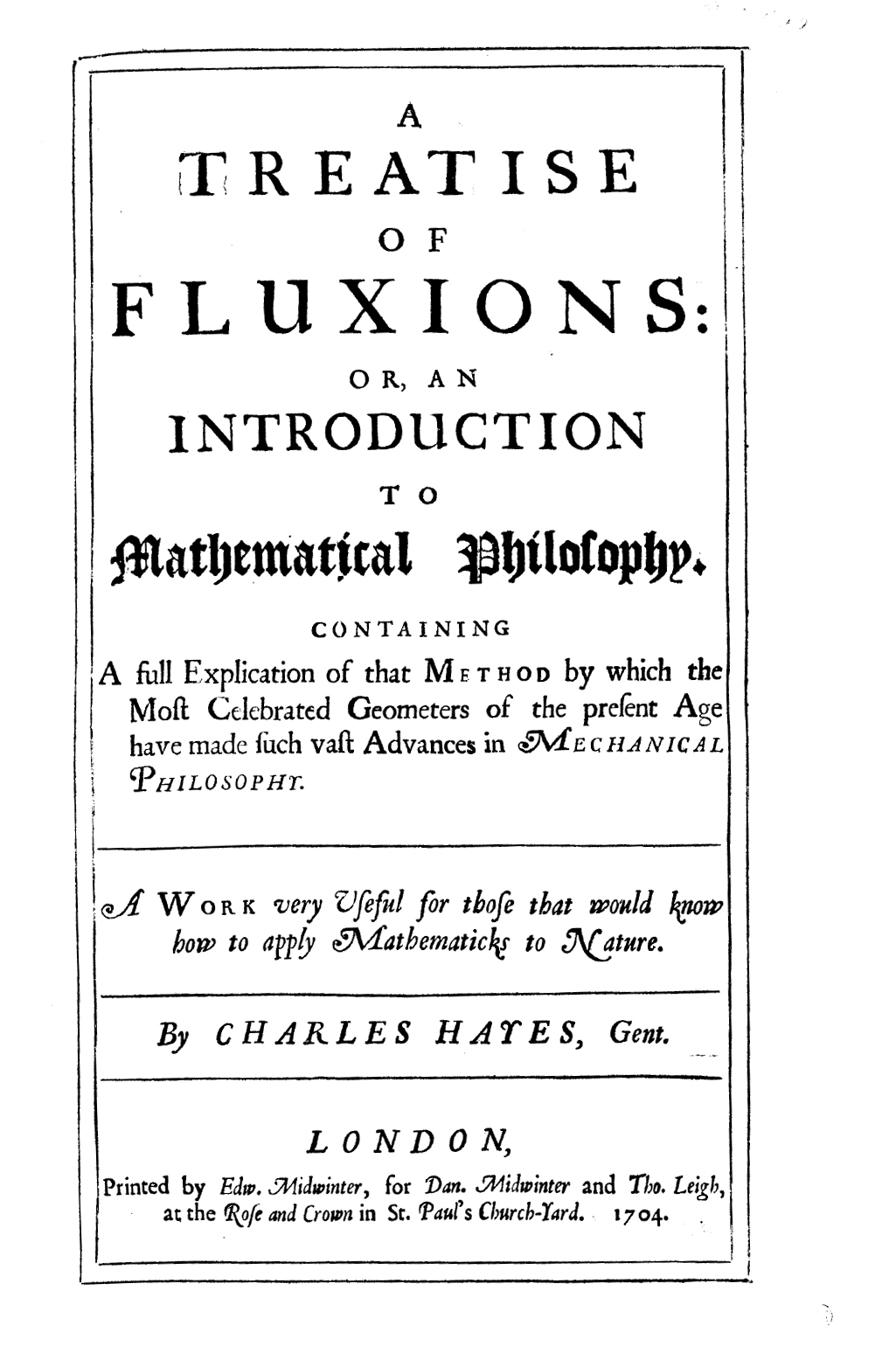
Treatise of fluxions, 1704

Charles Hayes (1678–1760) was an English mathematician, chronologist and slave trader who wrote a book on the method of fluxions. He also served as an official of the Royal African Company, which engaged in the Atlantic slave trade.

== Life ==
Hayes was a member of Gray's Inn. Having made a voyage to Africa and spent some time there, he had a reputation as a geographer, and was chosen annually to be sub-governor or deputy-governor of the Royal African Company (RAC), which engaged in the Atlantic slave trade. When the RAC was dissolved in 1752, Hayes settled at Downe, Kent. John Nichols remarks that Hayes spent much time in philosophical experiments. Hayes found favour with his contemporaries from his ‘sedate temper’ and clear exposition; and Charles Hutton remarked that he had erudition concealed by modesty. Hayes died at his chambers in Gray's Inn on 18 December 1760.

== Works ==
In 1704, appeared his Treatise on Fluxions, or an Introduction to Mathematical Philosophy, London, the first English work explaining Isaac Newton's method of infinitesimals. After an introduction on conic sections with concise proofs, Hayes applied Newton's method systematically, first to obtain the tangents of curves, then their areas, and lastly to problems of maxima and minima. His preface shows he was well read in mathematical literature. In 1710 he printed a pamphlet, New and Easy Method to find out the Longitude; and in 1723 The Moon, a Philosophical Dialogue, arguing that she is not opaque, but has some light of her own.

After studying Hebrew, Hayes in 1736 published his Vindication of the History of the Septuagint, and in 1738 Critical Examination of the Holy Gospels according to St. Matthew and St. Luke, with regard to the history of Christ's birth and infancy. His studies were from then mainly directed to chronology, except for some tracts written to defend the policy of the Royal African Company. In 1747 appeared his Series of Kings of Argos and of Emperors of China from Fohi to Jesus Christ, to prove that their dates and order of succession agreed with the Septuagint, and in 1751 a Dissertation on the Chronology of the Septuagint, a defence of the Chaldean and Egyptian chronology and history.

In retirement, he became absorbed in a major work, Chronographia Asiatica & Ægyptiaca, which he did not live to complete. Two parts of it only were published, during the last two years of his life, when he had chambers in Gray's Inn: first, Chronographiæ Asiaticæ & Ægyptiacæ Specimen, and the second, subdivided into (1) Origo Chronologiæ LXX interpretum investigatur, and (2) Conspectus totius Operis exhibetur. Part of his argument is that the Seventy (authors of the Septuagint) and Josephus made use of writings preserved in the library of the Second Temple of Jerusalem, which had been omitted in making up the Old Testament canon.
