= Antonio Schinella Conti =

Italian mathematician and physicist (1677–1749)

Antonio Schinella Conti (22 January 1677 in Padua – 6 April 1749 in Padua), also known by his religious title as Abate Conti ('Abbot Conti'), was an Italian writer, translator, mathematician, philosopher and physicist.

== Life ==
In 1699, Conti became an Oratorian Father in Venice, but ceased to fulfil priestly duties after 1708. His placement, however, had allowed him to follow studies in philosophy, mathematics, astronomy, science and medicine. This strengthened his belief in the ability of the human intellect to investigate reality and to come to conclusions at odds with the traditional religious interpretations current until then and to formulate his own theories.

In 1713 he left for Paris, where he befriended the scientific thinkers Bernard Le Bovier de Fontenelle, Nicolas Malebranche and Charles François de Cisternay du Fay. In 1715 he left for London to observe an eclipse of the sun and to visit Isaac Newton, for whom he acted as intermediary in the Leibniz-Newton calculus controversy. During this period he also began a lasting friendship with Lady Mary Wortley Montagu, whose poems he translated, and who made him the recipient of her more philosophical Turkish Embassy Letters (1717–18). Starting in autumn 1716, he left to spend six months in dialogue with thinkers in the Netherlands and Germany, and then returned to England, continuing both scientific and literary projects there.

In 1718 he returned to Paris, where he continued to play an active part in the intellectual life of the French capital and during that time began a verse translation of Jean Racine's Athalie and, with the help of the exiled politician Viscount Bolingbroke, continued his translation of Alexander Pope's The Rape of the Lock, although this was not published until after his death. Once back in Italy in 1726, he continued to encourage scientific studies at university level and with the support of Celia Grillo Borromeo drew up a plan for an Italian scientific academy. During much of this time his scientific work was subject to censorship, although a selection of his literary works appeared in 1739.

Free-thinking pillar of the Age of Enlightenment though he was, however, Conti could not entirely free himself from all the prejudices of his times. Coming from a patrician background and generally mixing with the titled and royalty, he vented his sarcasm upon the social pretensions of the Venetian composer Antonio Vivaldi. Again, despite enjoying the friendship and patronage of some of the foremost women intellectuals in Britain, France and Italy, he was at the same time advancing pseudo-scientific arguments to demonstrate not simply women's physical but also their mental inferiority.

As a dramatist and admirer of Shakespeare, Conti had begun his own blank verse Giulio Cesare in London and completed it in 1726. It was later followed by three more Roman tragedies: Giunio Bruto (1743), Marco Bruto (1744) and Druso (1748), which appeared with individual prefaces by the author. To his own plays may be added publication of the revised translation of Athalie and another of Voltaire's drama Mérope (Venice 1744). A dramatic excursion of a different sort was the series of experimental long cantatas he wrote for the Venetian composer Benedetto Marcello: the duet, Il Timoteo, with a text translated from John Dryden; then five monologues, Cantone, Lucrezia, Andromaca, Arianna abandonnata, and finally Cassandra.

During his life, Conti was made the subject of an ink drawing by the caricaturist Pier Leone Ghezzi. After his death a statue of him was commissioned by his home town in 1781 from the local sculptor Felice Chiereghin.

== Works ==
- Riflessioni su l'aurora boreale (in Italian). Venezia: Giovanni Battista Pasquali. 1739.
- [Opere]. 1 (in Italian). In Venezia: presso Giambatista Pasquali. 1739.
- [Opere]. 2 (in Italian). In Venezia: presso Giambatista Pasquali. 1756.
- Versioni poetiche (in Italian). Bari: Laterza. 1966.
