= Notation for differentiation =

Notation of differential calculus

In differential calculus, there is no single standard notation for differentiation. Instead, several notations for the derivative of a function or a dependent variable have been proposed by various mathematicians, including Leibniz, Newton, Lagrange, and Arbogast. The usefulness of each notation depends on the context in which it is used, and it is sometimes advantageous to use more than one notation in a given context. For more specialized settings—such as partial derivatives in multivariable calculus, tensor analysis, or vector calculus—other notations, such as subscript notation or the ∇ operator are common. The most common notations for differentiation (and its opposite operation, antidifferentiation or indefinite integration) are listed below.

== Leibniz's notation ==
The original notation employed by Gottfried Leibniz is used throughout mathematics. It is particularly common when the equation y = f(x) is regarded as a functional relationship between dependent and independent variables y and x. Leibniz's notation makes this relationship explicit by writing the derivative as:
$$\frac{dy}{dx}.$$
Furthermore, the derivative of f at x is therefore written
$$\frac{df}{dx}(x)\text{ or }\frac{d f(x)}{dx}\text{ or }\frac{d}{dx} f(x).$$

Higher derivatives are written as:
$$\frac{d^2y}{dx^2}, \frac{d^3y}{dx^3}, \frac{d^4y}{dx^4}, \ldots, \frac{d^ny}{dx^n}.$$
This is a suggestive notational device that comes from formal manipulations of symbols, as in,
$$\frac{d\left(\frac{dy}{dx}\right)}{dx} = \left(\frac{d}{dx}\right)^2y = \frac{d^2y}{dx^2}.$$

The value of the derivative of y at a point x = a may be expressed in two ways using Leibniz's notation:
$$\left.\frac{dy}{dx}\right|_{x=a} \text{ or } \frac{dy}{dx}(a).$$

Leibniz's notation allows one to specify the variable for differentiation (in the denominator). This is especially helpful when considering partial derivatives. It also makes the chain rule easy to remember and recognize:
$$\frac{dy}{dx} = \frac{dy}{du} \cdot \frac{du}{dx}.$$

Leibniz's notation for differentiation does not require assigning meaning to symbols such as dx or dy (known as differentials) on their own, and some authors do not attempt to assign these symbols meaning. Leibniz treated these symbols as infinitesimals. Later authors have assigned them other meanings, such as infinitesimals in non-standard analysis, or exterior derivatives. Commonly, dx is left undefined or equated with $\Delta x$, while dy is assigned a meaning in terms of dx, via the equation

$$dy = \frac{dy}{dx} \cdot dx,$$

which may also be written as, for example,

$$df = f'(x) \cdot dx$$

(see below). Such equations give rise to the terminology found in some texts wherein the derivative is referred to as the "differential coefficient" (the coefficient of dx).

Some authors and journals set the differential symbol d in roman type instead of italic: dx. The ISO/IEC 80000 scientific style guide recommends this style.

== Lagrange's notation ==
f′(x)
A function f of x, differentiated once in Lagrange's notation.

One of the most common modern notations for differentiation is named after Joseph Louis Lagrange, although it was in fact invented by Euler and popularized by the former. In Lagrange's notation, a prime mark denotes a derivative – hence it is sometimes called prime notation. If f is a function, then its derivative evaluated at x is written

$$f'(x).$$

It first appeared in print in 1749.

Higher derivatives are indicated using additional prime marks, as in $f''(x)$ for the second derivative and $f'''(x)$ for the third derivative. The use of repeated prime marks eventually becomes unwieldy; some authors continue by employing Roman numerals, usually in lower case, as in

$$f^{\mathrm{iv}}(x), f^{\mathrm{v}}(x), f^{\mathrm{vi}}(x), \ldots,$$

to denote fourth, fifth, sixth, and higher order derivatives. Other authors use Arabic numerals in parentheses, as in

$$f^{(4)}(x), f^{(5)}(x), f^{(6)}(x), \ldots.$$

This notation also makes it possible to describe the nth derivative, where n is a variable. This is written

$$f^{(n)}(x).$$

Unicode characters related to Lagrange's notation include

- U+2032 ◌′ PRIME (derivative)
- U+2033 ◌″ DOUBLE PRIME (double derivative)
- U+2034 ◌‴ TRIPLE PRIME (third derivative)
- U+2057 ◌⁗ QUADRUPLE PRIME (fourth derivative)

When there are two independent variables for a function $f(x,y)$, the following notation is sometimes used:

$$\begin{align}
f^\prime &= \frac{\partial f}{\partial x} = f_x \\[5pt]
f_\prime &= \frac{\partial f}{\partial y} = f_y \\[5pt]
f^{\prime\prime} &= \frac{\partial ^2 f}{\partial x^2} = f_{xx} \\[5pt]
f_\prime^\prime &= \frac{\partial ^2 f}{\partial y \partial x}\ = f_{xy} \\[5pt]
f_{\prime\prime} &= \frac{\partial ^2 f}{\partial y^2} = f_{yy}
\end{align}$$

=== Lagrange's notation for antidifferentiation ===
f^{(−1)}(x)
f^{(−2)}(x)
The single and double indefinite integrals of f with respect to x, in the Lagrange notation.

When taking the antiderivative, Lagrange followed Leibniz's notation:

$$f(x) = \int f'(x)\,dx = \int y'\,dx.$$

However, because integration is the inverse operation of differentiation, Lagrange's notation for higher order derivatives extends to integrals as well. Repeated integrals of f may be written as

$f^{(-1)}(x)$ for the first integral (this is easily confused with the inverse function $f^{-1}(x)$),
$f^{(-2)}(x)$ for the second integral,
$f^{(-3)}(x)$ for the third integral, and
$f^{(-n)}(x)$ for the nth integral.

== D-notation ==
D_{x}y
D^{2}f
The x derivative of y and the second derivative of f, Euler notation.

This notation is sometimes called Euler's notation although it was introduced by Louis François Antoine Arbogast, and it seems that Leonhard Euler did not use it.

This notation uses a differential operator denoted as D (D operator) or D̃ (Newton–Leibniz operator). When applied to a function f(x), it is defined by

$$(Df)(x) = \frac{df(x)}{dx}.$$

Higher derivatives are notated as "powers" of D (where the superscripts denote iterated composition of D), as in

$D^2f$ for the second derivative,
$D^3f$ for the third derivative, and
$D^nf$ for the nth derivative.

D-notation leaves implicit the variable with respect to which differentiation is being done. However, this variable can also be made explicit by putting its name as a subscript: if f is a function of a variable x, this is done by writing

$D_x f$ for the first derivative,
$D^2_x f$ for the second derivative,
$D^3_x f$ for the third derivative, and
$D^n_x f$ for the nth derivative.

When f is a function of several variables, it is common to use "∂", a stylized cursive lower-case d, rather than "D". As above, the subscripts denote the derivatives that are being taken. For example, the second partial derivatives of a function $f(x,y)$ are:

$$\begin{align}
& \partial_{xx} f = \frac{\partial^2 f}{\partial x^2}, \\[5pt]
& \partial_{xy} f = \frac{\partial^2 f}{\partial y\,\partial x}, \\[5pt]
& \partial_{yx} f = \frac{\partial^2 f}{\partial x\,\partial y}, \\[5pt]
& \partial_{yy} f = \frac{\partial^2 f}{\partial y^2}.
\end{align}$$

See § Partial derivatives.

D-notation is useful in the study of differential equations and in differential algebra.

=== D-notation for antiderivatives ===
D^{−1}_{x}y
D^{−2}f
The x antiderivative of y and the second antiderivative of f, Euler notation.

D-notation can be used for antiderivatives in the same way that Lagrange's notation is as follows

$D^{-1}f(x)$ for a first antiderivative,
$D^{-2}f(x)$ for a second antiderivative, and
$D^{-n}f(x)$ for an nth antiderivative.

== Newton's notation ==
ẋẍ
The first and second derivatives of x, Newton's notation.

Isaac Newton's notation for differentiation (also called the dot notation, fluxions, or sometimes, crudely, the flyspeck notation for differentiation) places a dot over the dependent variable. That is, if y is a function of t, then the derivative of y with respect to t is

$$\dot y$$

Higher derivatives are represented using multiple dots, as in

$$\ddot y, \overset{...}{y}$$

Newton extended this idea quite far:

$$\begin{align}
\ddot{y} &\equiv \frac{d^2y}{dt^2} = \frac{d}{dt}\left(\frac{dy}{dt}\right)  = \frac{d}{dt}\Bigl(\dot{y}\Bigr) = \frac{d}{dt}\Bigl(f'(t)\Bigr) = D_t^2 y = f''(t) = y''_t \\[5pt]
\overset{...}{y} &= \dot{\ddot{y}} \equiv \frac{d^3y}{dt^3} = D_t^3 y = f'''(t) = y'''_t \\[5pt]
\overset{\,4}{\dot{y}} &= \overset{....}{y} = \ddot{\ddot{y}} \equiv \frac{d^4y}{dt^4} = D_t^4 y = f^{\rm IV}(t) = y^{(4)}_t \\[5pt]
\overset{\,5}{\dot{y}} &= \ddot{\overset{...}{y}} = \dot{\ddot{\ddot{y}}} = \ddot{\dot{\ddot{y}}} \equiv \frac{d^5y}{dt^5} = D_t^5 y = f^{\rm V}(t) = y^{(5)}_t \\[5pt]
\overset{\,6}{\dot{y}} &= \overset{...}{\overset{...}{y}} \equiv \frac{d^6y}{dt^6} = D_t^6 y = f^{\rm VI}(t) = y^{(6)}_t \\[5pt]
\overset{\,7}{\dot{y}} &= \dot{\overset{...}{\overset{...}{y}}} \equiv \frac{d^7y}{dt^7} = D_t^7 y = f^{\rm VII}(t) = y^{(7)}_t \\[5pt]
\overset{\,10}{\dot{y}} &= \ddot{\ddot{\ddot{\ddot{\ddot{y}}}}} \equiv \frac{d^{10}y}{dt^{10}} = D_t^{10} y = f^{\rm X}(t) = y^{(10)}_t \\[5pt]
\overset{\,n}{\dot{y}} &\equiv \frac{d^ny}{dt^n} = D_t^n y = f^{(n)}(t) = y^{(n)}_t
\end{align}$$

Unicode characters related to Newton's notation include:

- U+0307 ◌̇ COMBINING DOT ABOVE (derivative)
- U+0308 ◌̈ COMBINING DIAERESIS (double derivative)
- U+20DB ◌⃛ COMBINING THREE DOTS ABOVE (third derivative) ← replaced by "combining diaeresis" + "combining dot above".
- U+20DC ◌⃜ COMBINING FOUR DOTS ABOVE (fourth derivative) ← replaced by "combining diaeresis" twice.
- U+030D ◌̍ COMBINING VERTICAL LINE ABOVE (integral)
- U+030E ◌̎ COMBINING DOUBLE VERTICAL LINE ABOVE (second integral)
- U+25AD ▭ WHITE RECTANGLE (integral)
- U+20DE ◌⃞ COMBINING ENCLOSING SQUARE (integral)
- U+1DE0 ◌ᷠ COMBINING LATIN SMALL LETTER N (nth derivative)

Newton's notation is generally used when the independent variable denotes time. If location y is a function of t, then $\dot y$ denotes velocity and $\ddot y$ denotes acceleration. This notation is popular in physics and mathematical physics. It also appears in areas of mathematics connected with physics such as differential equations.

When taking the derivative of a dependent variable y = f(x), an alternative notation exists:

$$\frac{\dot{y}}{\dot{x}} = \dot{y}:\dot{x} \equiv \frac{dy}{dt}:\frac{dx}{dt} = \frac{\frac{dy}{dt}}{\frac{dx}{dt}} = \frac{dy}{dx} = \frac{d}{dx}\Bigl(f(x)\Bigr) = D y = f'(x) = y'.$$

Newton developed the following partial differential operators using side-dots on a curved X ( ⵋ ). Definitions given by Whiteside are below:

$$\begin{align}
\mathcal{X}                                                            \ &=\  f(x,y) \,, \\[5pt]
\cdot\mathcal{X}                                                       \ &=\  x\frac{\partial f}{\partial x} = xf_x\,, \\[5pt]
\mathcal{X}\!\cdot                                                     \ &=\  y\frac{\partial f}{\partial y} = yf_y\,, \\[5pt]
\colon\!\mathcal{X}\,\text{ or }\,\cdot\!\left(\cdot\mathcal{X}\right) \ &=\  x^2\frac{\partial^2 f}{\partial x^2} = x^2 f_{xx}\,, \\[5pt]
\mathcal{X}\colon\,\text{ or }\,\left(\mathcal{X}\cdot\right)\!\cdot   \ &=\  y^2\frac{\partial^2 f}{\partial y^2} = y^2 f_{yy}\,, \\[5pt]
\cdot\mathcal{X}\!\cdot\                                               \ &=\  xy\frac{\partial^2 f}{\partial x \, \partial y} = xy f_{xy}\,,
\end{align}$$

=== Newton's notation for integration ===
x̍x̎
The first and second antiderivatives of x, in one of Newton's notations.

Newton developed many different notations for integration in his Quadratura curvarum (1704) and later works: he wrote a small vertical bar or prime above the dependent variable (y̍ ), a prefixing rectangle (▭y), or the inclosure of the term in a rectangle (y) to denote the fluent or time integral (absement).

$$\begin{align}
y &= \Box \dot{y} \equiv \int \dot{y} \,dt = \int f'(t) \,dt = D_t^{-1} (D_t y) = f(t) + C_0 = y_t + C_0 \\
\overset{\,\prime}{y} &= \Box y \equiv \int y \,dt = \int f(t) \,dt = D_t^{-1} y = F(t) + C_1
\end{align}$$

To denote multiple integrals, Newton used two small vertical bars or primes (y̎), or a combination of previous symbols ▭y̍ y̍, to denote the second time integral (absity).

$$\overset{\,\prime\prime}{y} = \Box \overset{\,\prime}{y} \equiv \int \overset{\,\prime}{y} \,dt = \int F(t) \,dt = D_t^{-2} y = g(t) + C_2$$

Higher order time integrals were as follows:

$$\begin{align}
\overset{\,\prime\prime\prime}{y} &= \Box \overset{\,\prime\prime}{y} \equiv \int \overset{\,\prime\prime}{y} \,dt = \int g(t) \,dt = D_t^{-3} y = G(t) + C_3 \\
\overset{\,\prime\prime\prime\prime}{y} &= \Box \overset{\,\prime\prime\prime}{y} \equiv \int \overset{\,\prime\prime\prime}{y} \,dt = \int G(t) \,dt = D_t^{-4} y = h(t) + C_4 \\
\overset{\;n}\overset{\,\prime}{y} &= \Box \overset{\;n-1}\overset{\,\prime}y \equiv \int \overset{\;n-1}\overset{\,\prime}y \,dt = \int s(t) \,dt = D_t^{-n} y = S(t) + C_n
\end{align}$$

This mathematical notation did not become widespread because of printing difficulties and the Leibniz–Newton calculus controversy.

== Partial derivatives ==
f_{x}f_{xy}
A function f differentiated against x, then against x and y.

When more specific types of differentiation are necessary, such as in multivariate calculus or tensor analysis, other notations are common.

For a function f of a single independent variable x, we can express the derivative using subscripts of the independent variable:

$$\begin{align}
f_x &= \frac{df}{dx} \\[5pt]
f_{x x} &= \frac{d^2f}{dx^2}.
\end{align}$$

This type of notation is especially useful for taking partial derivatives of a function of several variables.

∂f/∂x
A function f differentiated against x.

Partial derivatives are generally distinguished from ordinary derivatives by replacing the differential operator d with a "∂" symbol. For example, we can indicate the partial derivative of f(x, y, z) with respect to x, but not to y or z in several ways:

$$\frac{\partial f}{\partial x} = f_x = \partial_x f.$$

What makes this distinction important is that a non-partial derivative such as $\textstyle \frac{df}{dx}$ may, depending on the context, be interpreted as a rate of change in $f$ relative to $x$ when all variables are allowed to vary simultaneously, whereas with a partial derivative such as $\textstyle \frac{\partial f}{\partial x}$ it is explicit that only one variable should vary.

Other notations can be found in various subfields of mathematics, physics, and engineering; see for example the Maxwell relations of thermodynamics. The symbol $\left(\frac{\partial T}{\partial V}\right)_{\!S}$ is the derivative of the temperature T with respect to the volume V while keeping constant the entropy (subscript) S, while $\left(\frac{\partial T}{\partial V}\right)_{\!P}$ is the derivative of the temperature with respect to the volume while keeping constant the pressure P. This becomes necessary in situations where the number of variables exceeds the degrees of freedom, so that one has to choose which other variables are to be kept fixed.

Higher-order partial derivatives with respect to one variable are expressed as

$$\begin{align}
& \frac{\partial^2f}{\partial x^2} = f_{xx}, \\[5pt]
& \frac{\partial^3f}{\partial x^3} = f_{xxx},
\end{align}$$

and so on. Mixed partial derivatives can be expressed as

$$\frac{\partial^2 f}{\partial y  \, \partial x} = f_{xy}.$$

In this last case the variables are written in inverse order between the two notations, explained as follows:

$$\begin{align}
& (f_x)_y = f_{xy}, \\[5pt]
& \frac{\partial}{\partial y}\!\left(\frac{\partial f}{\partial x}\right) = \frac{\partial^2f}{\partial y \, \partial x}.
\end{align}$$

So-called multi-index notation is used in situations when the above notation becomes cumbersome or insufficiently expressive. When considering functions on $\R^n$, we define a multi-index to be an ordered list of $n$ non-negative integers: $\alpha = (\alpha_1,\ldots,\alpha_n), \ \alpha_i \in \Z_{\geq 0}$. We then define, for $f:\R^n \to X$, the notation

$$\partial^\alpha f = \frac{\partial^{\alpha_1}}{\partial x_1^{\alpha_1}} \cdots \frac{\partial^{\alpha_n}}{\partial x_n^{\alpha_n}} f$$

In this way some results (such as the Leibniz rule) that are tedious to write in other ways can be expressed succinctly -- some examples can be found in the article on multi-indices.

== Notation in vector calculus ==
Vector calculus concerns differentiation and integration of vector or scalar fields. Several notations specific to the case of three-dimensional Euclidean space are common.

Assume that (x, y, z) is a given Cartesian coordinate system, that A is a vector field with components $\mathbf{A} = (A_x, A_y, A_z)$, and that $\varphi = \varphi(x,y,z)$ is a scalar field.

The differential operator introduced by William Rowan Hamilton, written ∇ and called del or nabla, is symbolically defined in the form of a vector,

$$\nabla = \left( \frac{\partial}{\partial x}, \frac{\partial}{\partial y}, \frac{\partial}{\partial z} \right)\!,$$

where the terminology symbolically reflects that the operator ∇ will also be treated as an ordinary vector.

∇φ
Gradient of the scalar field φ.
- Gradient: The gradient $\mathrm{grad\,} \varphi$ of the scalar field $\varphi$ is a vector, which is symbolically expressed by the multiplication of ∇ and scalar field $\varphi$,

$$\begin{align}
\operatorname{grad} \varphi
&= \left( \frac{\partial \varphi}{\partial x}, \frac{\partial \varphi}{\partial y}, \frac{\partial \varphi}{\partial z} \right) \\
&= \left( \frac{\partial}{\partial x}, \frac{\partial}{\partial y}, \frac{\partial}{\partial z} \right) \varphi \\
&= \nabla \varphi
\end{align}$$

∇∙A
The divergence of the vector field A.
- Divergence: The divergence $\mathrm{div}\,\mathbf{A}$ of the vector field A is a scalar, which is symbolically expressed by the dot product of ∇ and the vector A,

$$\begin{align}
\operatorname{div} \mathbf{A}
&= {\partial A_x \over \partial x} + {\partial A_y \over \partial y} + {\partial A_z \over \partial z} \\
&= \left( \frac{\partial}{\partial x}, \frac{\partial}{\partial y}, \frac{\partial}{\partial z} \right)  \cdot \mathbf{A} \\
&= \nabla \cdot \mathbf{A}
\end{align}$$

∇^{2}φ
The Laplacian of the scalar field φ.
- Laplacian: The Laplacian $\operatorname{div} \operatorname{grad} \varphi$ of the scalar field $\varphi$ is a scalar, which is symbolically expressed by the scalar multiplication of ∇^{2} and the scalar field φ,

$$\begin{align}
\operatorname{div} \operatorname{grad} \varphi
&= \nabla \cdot (\nabla \varphi) \\
&= (\nabla \cdot \nabla) \varphi \\
&= \nabla^2 \varphi \\
&= \Delta \varphi \\
\end{align}$$

∇×A
The curl of vector field A.
- Rotation: The rotation $\mathrm{curl}\,\mathbf{A}$, or $\mathrm{rot}\,\mathbf{A}$, of the vector field A is a vector, which is symbolically expressed by the cross product of ∇ and the vector A,

$$\begin{align}
\operatorname{curl} \mathbf{A}
&= \left(
{\partial A_z \over {\partial y} } - {\partial A_y \over {\partial z} },
{\partial A_x \over {\partial z} } - {\partial A_z \over {\partial x} },
{\partial A_y \over {\partial x} } - {\partial A_x \over {\partial y} }
\right) \\
&= \left( {\partial A_z \over {\partial y} } - {\partial A_y \over {\partial z} } \right) \mathbf{i} +
\left( {\partial A_x \over {\partial z} } - {\partial A_z \over {\partial x} } \right) \mathbf{j} +
\left( {\partial A_y \over {\partial x} } - {\partial A_x \over {\partial y} } \right) \mathbf{k} \\
&= \begin{vmatrix}
\mathbf{i} & \mathbf{j} & \mathbf{k} \\
\cfrac{\partial}{\partial x} & \cfrac{\partial}{\partial y} & \cfrac{\partial}{\partial z} \\
A_x & A_y & A_z
\end{vmatrix} \\
&= \nabla \times \mathbf{A}
\end{align}$$

Many symbolic operations of derivatives can be generalized in a straightforward manner by the gradient operator in Cartesian coordinates. For example, the single-variable product rule has a direct analogue in the multiplication of scalar fields by applying the gradient operator, as in

$$(f g)' = f' g+f g' ~~~ \Longrightarrow ~~~ \nabla(\phi \psi) = (\nabla \phi) \psi + \phi (\nabla \psi).$$

Many other rules from single variable calculus have vector calculus analogues for the gradient, divergence, curl, and Laplacian.

Further notations have been developed for more exotic types of spaces. For calculations in Minkowski space, the d'Alembert operator, also called the d'Alembertian, wave operator, or box operator is represented as $\Box$, or as $\Delta$ when not in conflict with the symbol for the Laplacian.

== See also ==
- Analytical Society – 19th-century British organisation for the promotion of Leibniz's calculus
- Derivative – Instantaneous rate of change (mathematics)
- Fluxion – Historical mathematical concept; form of derivative
- Hessian matrix – Matrix of second derivatives
- Jacobian matrix – Matrix of partial derivatives of a vector-valued function
- List of mathematical symbols by subject
- Operational calculus
