= Frullani integral =

Type of improper integral with general solution

In mathematics, Frullani integrals (also called Cauchy–Frullani integrals) are a specific type of improper integral named after the Italian mathematician Giuliano Frullani (and the French mathematician Augustin Cauchy). The integrals are of the form

$$\int _{0}^{\infty}{\frac {f(ax)-f(bx)}{x}}\,{\rm {d}}x$$

where $f$ is a function defined for all non-negative real numbers that has a limit at $\infty$, which we denote by $f(\infty)$.

The formula below appears without proof in a letter from Frullani dated 1821 and was proved by Cauchy in 1823.

The following formula for their general solution holds if $f$ is continuous on $(0,\infty)$, has finite limit at $\infty$, and $a,b > 0$:

$$\int _{0}^{\infty }{\frac {f(ax)-f(bx)}{x}}\,{\rm {d}}x=\Big(f(\infty)-f(0)\Big)\ln {\frac {a}{b}}.$$

If $f (\infty)$ does not exist, but $\int_c^\infty \frac{f(x)}{x} dx$ exists for some $c > 0$, then
$$\int _{0}^{\infty }{\frac {f(ax)-f(bx)}{x}}\,{\rm {d}}x= -f(0)\ln {\frac {a}{b}}.$$

== Proof for continuously differentiable functions ==
A simple proof of the formula (under stronger assumptions than those stated above, namely $f \in \mathcal{C}^1(0,\infty)$) can be arrived at by using the Fundamental theorem of calculus to express the integrand as an integral of $f'(xt) = \frac{\partial }{\partial t} \left(\frac{f(xt)}{x}\right)$:

$$\begin{align}
\frac{f(ax)-f(bx)}{x} &= \left[\frac{f(xt)}{x}\right]_{t=b}^{t=a} \, \\
& = \int_b^a f'(xt) \, dt \\
\end{align}$$

and then use Tonelli’s theorem to interchange the two integrals:

$$\begin{align}
\int_0^\infty \frac{f(ax)-f(bx)}{x} \,dx
& = \int_0^\infty \int_b^a f'(xt) \, dt \, dx \\
& = \int_b^a \int_0^\infty f'(xt) \, dx \, dt \\
& = \int_b^a \left[\frac{f(xt)}{t}\right]_{x=0}^{x \to \infty}\, dt \\
& = \int_b^a \frac{f(\infty)-f(0)}{t}\, dt \\
& = \Big(f(\infty)-f(0)\Big)\Big(\ln(a)-\ln(b)\Big) \\
& = \Big(f(\infty)-f(0)\Big)\ln\Big(\frac{a}{b}\Big) \\
\end{align}$$

Note that the integral in the second line above has been taken over the interval $[b,a]$, not $[a,b]$.

== Ramanujan's generalization ==
Ramanujan, using his master theorem, gave the following generalization.

Let $f, g$ be functions continuous on $[0, \infty]$.
$$f(x)-f(\infty)=\sum_{k=0}^{\infty} \frac{u(k)(-x)^k}{k!} \quad \text { and } \quad g(x)-g(\infty)=\sum_{k=0}^{\infty} \frac{v(k)(-x)^k}{k!}$$
Let $u(x)$ and $v(x)$ be given as above, and assume that $f$ and $g$ are continuous functions on $[0, \infty)$. Also assume that $f(0)=g(0)$ and $f(\infty)=g(\infty)$. Then, if $a, b>0$,

$$\lim _{n \rightarrow 0} \int_0^{\infty} x^{n-1}\{f(a x)-g(b x)\} d x=\{f(0)-f(\infty)\}\left\{\log \left(\frac{b}{a}\right)+\frac{d}{d s}\left(\log \left(\frac{v(s)}{u(s)}\right)\right)_{s=0}\right\}$$

== Applications ==
The formula can be used to derive an integral representation for the natural logarithm $\ln(x)$ by letting $f(x) = e^{-x}$ and $a=1$:

$${\int _{0}^{\infty}{\frac {e^{-x}-e^{-bx}}{x}}\,{\rm {d}}x=\Big(\lim_{n\to\infty}\frac{1}{e^n}-e^0\Big)\ln \Big({\frac {1}{b}}}\Big) = \ln(b)$$

The formula can also be generalized in several different ways.
