= De analysi per aequationes numero terminorum infinitas =

Mathematical work by Isaac Newton

De analysi per aequationes numero terminorum infinitas (or On analysis by infinite series, On Analysis by Equations with an infinite number of terms, or On the Analysis by means of equations of an infinite number of terms) is a mathematical work by Sir Isaac Newton.

== Creation ==
Composed in 1669, during the mid-part of that year probably, from ideas Newton had acquired during the period 1665–1666. Newton wrote

And whatever the common Analysis performs by Means of Equations of a finite number of Terms (provided that can be done) this new method can always perform the same by means of infinite Equations. So that I have not made any Question of giving this the name of Analysis likewise. For the Reasonings in this are no less certain than in the other, nor the Equations less exact; albeit we Mortals whose reasoning Powers are confined within narrow Limits, can neither express, nor so conceive the Terms of these Equations as to know exactly from thence the Quantities we want. To conclude, we may justly reckon that to belong to the Analytic Art, by the help of which the Areas and Lengths, etc. of Curves may be exactly and geometrically determined. Newton

The explication was written to remedy apparent weaknesses in the logarithmic series [infinite series for $\log(1 + x)$] , that had become republished due to Nicolaus Mercator, or through the encouragement of Isaac Barrow in 1669, to ascertain the knowing of the prior authorship of a general method of infinite series. The writing was circulated amongst scholars as a manuscript in 1669, including John Collins a mathematics intelligencer for a group of British and continental mathematicians. His relationship with Newton in the capacity of informant proved instrumental in securing Newton recognition and contact with John Wallis at the Royal Society. Both Cambridge University Press and Royal Society rejected the treatise from publication, being instead published in London in 1711 by William Jones, and again in 1744, as Methodus fluxionum et serierum infinitarum cum eisudem applicatione ad curvarum geometriam in Opuscula mathematica, philosophica et philologica by Marcum-Michaelem Bousquet at that time edited by Johann Castillioneus.

== Content ==
The exponential series, i.e., tending toward infinity, was discovered by Newton and is contained within the Analysis. The treatise contains also the sine series and cosine series and arc series, the logarithmic series and the binomial series.

== See also ==
- Newton's method
