= Komkov =

Komkov (Russian: Комков, from комок meaning small lump) is a Russian masculine surname, its feminine counterpart is Komkova. It may refer to

- Mikhail Komkov (born 1984), Russian football player
- Saba Komkova, Soviet sprint canoer
- Vadim Komkov (1919–2008), Russian-American mathematician

== See also ==
- Komov
