= Elementary calculus =

Elementary calculus may refer to:

- The elementary aspects of differential and integral calculus;
- Elementary Calculus: An Infinitesimal Approach, a textbook by Jerome Keisler.
