= International Mathematical Modeling Challenge =

High school mathematical modeling competition

- Founder: Sol Garfunkel
- Founded at: Boston, MA
- Type: Mathematics Competition
- Headquarters: Boston, MA
- Location: International
- Official language: English
- Co-Founders: Sol Garfunkel and Alfred Cheung
- Parent organization: COMAP, NeoUnion
- Website: immchallenge.org

The International Mathematical Modeling Challenge (IMMC or sometimes IM^{2}C) is an international mathematical modeling competition for high school students in team mathematical modeling co-sponsored by COMAP and the NeoUnion ESC Organization. Teams are selected on a country-by-country basis, with each country sending up to two teams to the competition. The IMMC was inspired by the High School Mathematical Contest in Modeling (HiMCM), a similar contest sponsored by COMAP but mainly attracting teams within the United States. The HiMCM in turn was established in the 1990s to create a high school counterpart to COMAP’s MCM. Contestants in the IMMC are given five days to research (the contest permits the use of any inanimate source) and write a mathematical paper detailing their mathematical model for a given situation. At the conclusion of the five-day period, papers are sent to an international expert committee composed of mathematics faculty from the world’s leading universities. Traditionally, 2-4 teams are awarded the top designation of Outstanding and invited to an awards ceremony, held in a different country or region each year.

== Team selection ==
Each participating country is expected to choose its two best teams of one to four contestants each to compete in the IMMC. Globally, different methods have been used to select teams from their respective countries.

Hong Kong holds the contest early and allows any interested team to participate. A national judging panel selects the two best papers to move on to the international round of the competition. In 2015, 60 papers came out of the Greater China region alone.

In 2015, the United States used a different qualification process, inviting the top two teams from the 2014 HiMCM to compete in the IMMC. In 2016, the United States adopted a hybrid of Hong Kong’s approach and its own former approach: any team receiving a score of Meritorious or higher in the 2015 HiMCM (roughly 25% of competing teams) was invited to compete in the 2016 IMMC. As in Hong Kong, the United States held the IMMC early, completed a national round of judging, and selected the two best papers to move on to the international round.

Most countries use a selection process similar to that used by Hong Kong, and countries entering the IMMC for the first time will also likely adopt a similar process.

== Judging ==
Papers passing the national selection round move on to the international expert judging panel.

== Participation ==
=== 2015 ===
17 teams from the following countries competed in the 2015 IMMC:

- Belgium
- Hong Kong SAR
- Macau SAR
- People's Republic of China
- Russia
- Singapore
- Slovakia
- Thailand
- The Netherlands
- United States of America

=== 2016 ===
40 teams from the following 23 countries or regions competed in the 2016 IMMC:

- Australia
- Belgium
- Bulgaria
- Canada
- Chile
- People's Republic of China
- Germany
- Hong Kong
- Japan
- Macau
- Malaysia
- Mexico
- The Netherlands
- New Zealand
- Philippines
- Russia
- Singapore
- Slovakia
- South Korea
- Taiwan
- Thailand
- United Kingdom
- United States of America

=== 2017 ===
49 teams from the following 27 countries/regions competed in the 2017 IMMC:

- Argentina
- Australia
- Canada
- China
- Denmark
- Germany
- Hong Kong (SAR)
- Israel
- Japan
- Macau (SAR)
- Malaysia
- Mexico
- New Zealand
- Papua New Guinea
- Philippines
- Poland
- Portugal
- Russia
- Singapore
- Slovakia
- South Korea
- Taiwan
- Thailand
- The Netherlands
- Turkey
- United States of America
- US Virgin Islands

=== 2024 ===
68 teams from the following 36 countries/regions competed in the 2024 IMMC:

- Argentina
- Australia
- Azerbaijan
- Austria
- Cameroon
- Canada
- Chile
- China
- Egypt
- Germany
- Hong Kong (SAR)
- Indonesia
- Ireland
- Macau (SAR)
- Mexico
- Nepal
- The Netherlands
- New Zealand
- Norway
- Pakistan
- Philippines
- Poland
- Portugal
- Russia
- Singapore
- Slovakia
- South Korea
- Spain
- Syria
- Taiwan
- Thailand
- Turkey
- United Arab Emirates
- United Kingdom
- USA
- Vietnam

=== 2025 ===
69 teams from the following 39 countries/regions participated in the 2025 IMMC. In addition, Romania was unsuccessful

- Argentina
- Australia
- Austria
- Bangladesh
- Cameroon
- Canada
- Chile
- China
- Germany
- Hong Kong (SAR)
- India
- Indonesia
- Kazakhstan
- Macau (SAR)
- Mexico
- Nepal
- New Zealand
- The Netherlands
- Norway
- Malaysia
- Pakistan
- Philippines
- Poland
- Russia
- Saudi Arabia
- Singapore
- Slovakia
- South Korea
- Spain
- Syria
- Taiwan
- Thailand
- Turkey
- Turkmenistan
- United Arab Emirates
- United Kingdom
- USA
- Vietnam

== Results ==
Outstanding Teams Summary
Year	Country/Region	City	School
2015	USA	Palo Alto, CA	Palo Alto High School
2015	China	Beijing	The Affiliated High School of Peking University
2015	Singapore	Singapore	Raffles Girls' School (Secondary)
2015	China	Shanghai	Shanghai Nanyang Model High School
2016	USA	Palo Alto, CA	Palo Alto High School
2016	Hong Kong SAR	Kowloon	Diocesan Girls' School
2016	Hong Kong SAR	Kowloon	Pui Ching Middle School
2017	USA	Durham, NC	NC School of Science and Mathematics
2018	Australia	Bruce, ACT	Radford College
2019	Hong Kong SAR	Mid-Levels	St. Paul's Co-educational College
2019	Australia	Toowong, Queensland	Brisbane Boys' College
2019	New Zealand	Manurewa, Auckland	Manurewa High School
2019	Poland	Warsaw, Mazovia	II Liceum Ogólnokształcące z Oddziałami Dwujęzycznymi im. Stefana Batorego
2019	Netherlands	Utrecht	Utrechts Stedelijk Gymnasium
2020	Singapore	Singapore	Anglo Chinese School (Independent)
2020	The United Kingdom	Wimborne Minster, England	Canford School
2021	Hong Kong SAR	Kowloon	Diocesan Girls' School
2021	Singapore	Singapore	Hwa Chong Institution
2022	New Zealand	Strowan, Christchurch	St Andrew's College
2022	Thailand	Wang Chan District, Rayong	Kamnoetvidya Science Academy
2023	Canada	St. Catharines, Ontario	Ridley College
2023	Germany	Kaiserslautern, Rheinland-Pfalz	Heinrich-Heine-Gymnasium
2024	Hong Kong SAR	Tai Wai	Pui Kiu College
2024	China	Shenzhen, Guangdong	Shenzhen Middle School
2025	South Korea	Hoengseong	Korean Minjok Leadership Academy
2025	New Zealand	Auckland	Macleans College
