= Ximera =

Open online calculus course

Ximera (pronounced “chimera”) is an open-source, interactive textbook platform, most commonly used in teaching math. The name stands for "Ximera: Interactive, Mathematics, Education, Resources, for All." Content is authored using LaTeX, and can run on GitHub and Overleaf with no prior installation. Currently, there are at least 13 courses hosted on Ximera, and it is used by over 45,000 students with an estimated savings of $5.4 million. A preprint on arXiv was also created with "the help of Ximera".

== Features ==
Ximera supports embedding of GeoGebra and Desmos interactives with a LaTeX command. An interactive answer box gives immediate feedback to students, and the grades can be integrated with Canvas, the learning management system. The accessibility features have also been promoted by the Mathematical Association of America.

== Development ==
MOOCulus Logo

The first Ximera course was initially released on Coursera in the Spring Semester of 2012–13 under the name Calculus One. MOOCulus, an online platform that lets you practice Calculus was developed at the Ohio State University to provide students a place to practice Calculus problems. The platform, which was built using Ruby on Rails was built because Coursera didn't offer an engaging way to practice problems. The whole course, which consists of 200+ videos, was typeset as a textbook on April 10, 2014. The textbook, which is licensed under Creative Commons Attribution Non-commercial Share Alike License, incorporated some of its example and exercise problems from Elementary calculus: An approach using Infinitesimals.

In 2023, Ximera received a $2.1 million grant from the Department of Education. Students are expected to save $4 million to $10 a year. As part of the funding, accessibility (defined by Web Content Accessibility Guidelines 2.1AA) is a requirement, and they partnered with "Tailor Swift Bot" for that work. This is to comply with United States Department of Justice rules for Title II of the Americans with Disabilities Act, effective April 2026.
