= Stroyan =

Stroyan is a surname. Notable people with the surname include:

- John Stroyan (bishop) (born 1955), Scottish-born Anglican bishop
- John Stroyan (politician) (1856–1941), Scottish industrialist and politician
- Keith Stroyan, American mathematician
- Johanna Ropner (born Johanna Stroyan, 1963), British businesswoman
