= Criticism of nonstandard analysis =

Nonstandard analysis and its offshoot, nonstandard calculus, have been criticized by several authors, notably Errett Bishop, Paul Halmos, and Alain Connes. These criticisms are analyzed below.

== Introduction ==
The evaluation of nonstandard analysis in the literature has varied greatly. Paul Halmos described it as a technical special development in mathematical logic. Terence Tao summed up the advantage of the hyperreal framework by noting that it

allows one to rigorously manipulate things such as "the set of all small numbers", or to rigorously say things like "η_{1} is smaller than anything that involves η_{0}", while greatly reducing epsilon management issues by automatically concealing many of the quantifiers in one's argument.

— Terence Tao, "Structure and randomness", American Mathematical Society (2008)

The nature of the criticisms is not directly related to the logical status of the results proved using nonstandard analysis. In terms of conventional mathematical foundations in classical logic, such results are quite acceptable although usually strongly dependent on choice. Abraham Robinson's nonstandard analysis does not need any axioms beyond Zermelo–Fraenkel set theory (ZFC) (as shown explicitly by Wilhelmus Luxemburg's ultrapower construction of the hyperreals), while its variant by Edward Nelson, known as internal set theory, is similarly a conservative extension of ZFC. It provides an assurance that the newness of nonstandard analysis is entirely as a strategy of proof, not in range of results. Further, model theoretic nonstandard analysis, for example based on superstructures, which is now a commonly used approach, does not need any new set-theoretic axioms beyond those of ZFC.

Controversy has existed on issues of mathematical pedagogy. Also nonstandard analysis as developed is not the only candidate to fulfill the aims of a theory of infinitesimals (see Smooth infinitesimal analysis). Philip J. Davis wrote, in a book review of Left Back: A Century of Failed School Reforms by Diane Ravitch:

There was the nonstandard analysis movement for teaching elementary calculus. Its stock rose a bit before the movement collapsed from inner complexity and scant necessity.

Nonstandard calculus in the classroom has been analysed in the study by K. Sullivan of schools in the Chicago area, as reflected in secondary literature at Influence of nonstandard analysis. Sullivan showed that students following the nonstandard analysis course were better able to interpret the sense of the mathematical formalism of calculus than a control group following a standard syllabus. This was also noted by Artigue (1994), page 172; Chihara (2007); and Dauben (1988).

== Bishop's criticism ==
In the view of Errett Bishop, classical mathematics, which includes Robinson's approach to nonstandard analysis, was nonconstructive and therefore deficient in numerical meaning (Feferman 2000). Bishop was particularly concerned about the use of nonstandard analysis in teaching as he discussed in his essay "Crisis in mathematics" (Bishop 1975). Specifically, after discussing Hilbert's formalist program he wrote:

A more recent attempt at mathematics by formal finesse is non-standard analysis. I gather that it has met with some degree of success, whether at the expense of giving significantly less meaningful proofs I do not know. My interest in non-standard analysis is that attempts are being made to introduce it into calculus courses. It is difficult to believe that debasement of meaning could be carried so far.

Katz & Katz (2010) note that a number of criticisms were voiced by the participating mathematicians and historians following Bishop's "Crisis" talk, at the American Academy of Arts and Sciences workshop in 1974. However, not a word was said by the participants about Bishop's debasement of Robinson's theory. Katz & Katz point out that it recently came to light that Bishop in fact said not a word about Robinson's theory at the workshop, and only added his debasement remark at the galley proof stage of publication. This helps explain the absence of critical reactions at the workshop. Katz & Katz conclude that this raises issues of integrity on the part of Bishop whose published text does not report the fact that the "debasement" comment was added at galley stage and therefore was not heard by the workshop participants, creating a spurious impression that they did not disagree with the comments.

The fact that Bishop viewed the introduction of nonstandard analysis in the classroom as a "debasement of meaning" was noted by J. Dauben. The term was clarified by Bishop (1985, p. 1) in his text Schizophrenia in contemporary mathematics (first distributed in 1973), as follows:

Brouwer's criticisms of classical mathematics were concerned with what I shall refer to as "the debasement of meaning".

Thus, Bishop first applied the term "debasement of meaning" to classical mathematics as a whole, and later applied it to Robinson's infinitesimals in the classroom. In his Foundations of Constructive Analysis (1967, page ix), Bishop wrote:

Our program is simple: To give numerical meaning to as much as possible of classical abstract analysis. Our motivation is the well-known scandal, exposed by Brouwer (and others) in great detail, that classical mathematics is deficient in numerical meaning.

Bishop's remarks are supported by the discussion following his lecture:

- George Mackey (Harvard): "I don't want to think about these questions. I have faith that what I am doing will have some kind of meaning...."
- Garrett Birkhoff (Harvard): "...I think this is what Bishop is urging. We should keep track of our assumptions and keep an open mind."
- Shreeram Abhyankar: (Purdue): "My paper is in complete sympathy with Bishop's position."
- J. P. Kahane (U. de Paris): "...I have to respect Bishop's work but I find it boring...."
- Bishop (UCSD): "Most mathematicians feel that mathematics has meaning but it bores them to try to find out what it is...."
- Kahane: "I feel that Bishop's appreciation has more significance than my lack of appreciation."

=== Bishop's review ===
Bishop reviewed the book Elementary Calculus: An Infinitesimal Approach by Howard Jerome Keisler, which presented elementary calculus using the methods of nonstandard analysis. Bishop was chosen by his advisor Paul Halmos to review the book. The review appeared in the Bulletin of the American Mathematical Society in 1977. This article is referred to by David O. Tall (Tall 2001) while discussing the use of nonstandard analysis in education. Tall wrote:

the use of the axiom of choice in the non-standard approach however, draws extreme criticism from those such as Bishop (1977) who insisted on explicit construction of concepts in the intuitionist tradition.

Bishop's review supplied several quotations from Keisler's book, such as:

In 1960, Robinson solved a three-hundred-year-old problem by giving a precise treatment of infinitesimals. Robinson's achievement will probably rank as one of the major mathematical advances of the twentieth century.

and

In discussing the real line we remarked that we have no way of knowing what a line in physical space is really like. It might be like the hyperreal line, the real line, or neither. However, in applications of the calculus, it is helpful to imagine a line in physical space as a hyperreal line.

The review criticized Keisler's text for not providing evidence to support these statements, and for adopting an axiomatic approach when it was not clear to the students there was any system that satisfied the axioms (Tall 1980). The review ended as follows:

The technical complications introduced by Keisler's approach are of minor importance. The real damage lies in [Keisler's] obfuscation and devitalization of those wonderful ideas [of standard calculus]. No invocation of Newton and Leibniz is going to justify developing calculus using axioms V* and VI*-on the grounds that the usual definition of a limit is too complicated!

and

Although it seems to be futile, I always tell my calculus students that mathematics is not esoteric: It is common sense. (Even the notorious (ε, δ)-definition of limit is common sense, and moreover it is central to the important practical problems of approximation and estimation.) They do not believe me. In fact the idea makes them uncomfortable because it contradicts their previous experience. Now we have a calculus text that can be used to confirm their experience of mathematics as an esoteric and meaningless exercise in technique.

=== Responses ===
In his response in The Notices, Keisler (1977, p. 269) asked:

why did Paul Halmos, the Bulletin book review editor, choose a constructivist as the reviewer?

Comparing the use of the law of excluded middle (rejected by constructivists) to wine, Keisler likened Halmos' choice with "choosing a teetotaller to sample wine".

Bishop's book review was subsequently criticized in the same journal by Martin Davis, who wrote on p. 1008 of Davis (1977):

Keisler's book is an attempt to bring back the intuitively suggestive Leibnizian methods that dominated the teaching of calculus until comparatively recently, and which have never been discarded in parts of applied mathematics. A reader of Errett Bishop's review of Keisler's book would hardly imagine that this is what Keisler was trying to do, since the review discusses neither Keisler's objectives nor the extent to which his book realizes them.

Davis added (p. 1008) that Bishop stated his objections

without informing his readers of the constructivist context in which this objection is presumably to be understood.

Physicist Vadim Komkov (1977, p. 270) wrote:

Bishop is one of the foremost researchers favoring the constructive approach to mathematical analysis. It is hard for a constructivist to be sympathetic to theories replacing the real numbers by hyperreals.

Whether or not nonstandard analysis can be done constructively, Komkov perceived a foundational concern on Bishop's part.

Philosopher of Mathematics Geoffrey Hellman (1993, p. 222) wrote:

Some of Bishop's remarks (1967) suggest that his position belongs in [the radical constructivist] category ...

Historian of Mathematics Joseph Dauben analyzed Bishop's criticism in (1988, p. 192). After evoking the "success" of nonstandard analysis

at the most elementary level at which it could be introduced—namely, at which calculus is taught for the first time,

Dauben stated:

there is also a deeper level of meaning at which nonstandard analysis operates.

Dauben mentioned "impressive" applications in

physics, especially quantum theory and thermodynamics, and in economics, where study of exchange economies has been particularly amenable to nonstandard interpretation.

At this "deeper" level of meaning, Dauben concluded,

Bishop's views can be questioned and shown to be as unfounded as his objections to nonstandard analysis pedagogically.

A number of authors have commented on the tone of Bishop's book review. Artigue (1992) described it as virulent; Dauben (1996), as vitriolic; Davis and Hauser (1978), as hostile; Tall (2001), as extreme.

Ian Stewart (1986) compared Halmos' asking Bishop to review Keisler's book, to inviting Margaret Thatcher to review Das Kapital.

Katz & Katz (2010) point out that

Bishop is criticizing apples for not being oranges: the critic (Bishop) and the criticized (Robinson's non-standard analysis) do not share a common foundational framework.

They further note that

Bishop's preoccupation with the extirpation of the law of excluded middle led him to criticize classical mathematics as a whole in as vitriolic a manner as his criticism of non-standard analysis.

G. Stolzenberg responded to Keisler's Notices criticisms of Bishop's review in a letter, also published in The Notices. Stolzenberg argues that the criticism of Bishop's review of Keisler's calculus book is based on the false assumption that they were made in a constructivist mindset whereas Stolzenberg believes that Bishop read it as it was meant to be read: in a classical mindset.

== Connes' criticism ==
In "Brisure de symétrie spontanée et géométrie du point de vue spectral", Journal of Geometry and Physics 23 (1997), 206–234, Alain Connes wrote:

"The answer given by non-standard analysis, namely a nonstandard real, is equally disappointing: every non-standard real canonically determines a (Lebesgue) non-measurable subset of the interval [0, 1], so that it is impossible (Stern, 1985) to exhibit a single [nonstandard real number]. The formalism that we propose will give a substantial and computable answer to this question."

In his 1995 article "Noncommutative geometry and reality" Connes develops a calculus of infinitesimals based on operators in Hilbert space. He proceeds to "explain why the formalism of nonstandard analysis is inadequate" for his purposes. Connes points out the following three aspects of Robinson's hyperreals:

(1) a nonstandard hyperreal "cannot be exhibited" (the reason given being its relation to nonmeasurable sets);

(2) "the practical use of such a notion is limited to computations in which the final result is independent of the exact value of the above infinitesimal. This is the way nonstandard analysis and ultraproducts are used [...]".

(3) the hyperreals are commutative.

Katz & Katz analyze Connes' criticisms of nonstandard analysis, and challenge the specific claims (1) and (2). With regard to (1), Connes' own infinitesimals similarly rely on non-constructive foundational material, such as the existence of a Dixmier trace. With regard to (2), Connes presents the independence of the choice of infinitesimal as a feature of his own theory.

Kanovei et al. (2012) analyze Connes' contention that nonstandard numbers are "chimerical". They note that the content of his criticism is that ultrafilters are "chimerical", and point out that Connes exploited ultrafilters in an essential manner in his earlier work in functional analysis. They analyze Connes' claim that the hyperreal theory is merely "virtual". Connes' references to the work of Robert Solovay suggest that Connes means to criticize the hyperreals for allegedly not being definable. If so, Connes' claim concerning the hyperreals is demonstrably incorrect, given the existence of a definable model of the hyperreals constructed by Vladimir Kanovei and Saharon Shelah (2004). Kanovei et al. (2012) also provide a chronological table of increasingly vitriolic epithets employed by Connes to denigrate nonstandard analysis over the period between 1995 and 2007, starting with "inadequate" and "disappointing" and culminating with "the end of the road for being 'explicit'".

Katz & Leichtnam (2013) note that "two-thirds of Connes' critique of Robinson's infinitesimal approach can be said to be incoherent, in the specific sense of not being coherent with what Connes writes (approvingly) about his own infinitesimal approach."

== Halmos' remarks ==
Paul Halmos writes in "Invariant subspaces", American Mathematical Monthly 85 (1978) 182–183 as follows:

"the extension to polynomially compact operators was obtained by Bernstein and Robinson (1966). They presented their result in the metamathematical language called non-standard analysis, but, as it was realized very soon, that was a matter of personal preference, not necessity."

Halmos writes in (Halmos 1985) as follows (p. 204):

The Bernstein–Robinson proof [of the invariant subspace conjecture of Halmos] uses non-standard models of higher order predicate languages, and when [Robinson] sent me his reprint I really had to sweat to pinpoint and translate its mathematical insight.

While commenting on the "role of non-standard analysis in mathematics", Halmos writes (p. 204):

For some other[... mathematicians], who are against it (for instance Errett Bishop), it's an equally emotional issue...

Halmos concludes his discussion of nonstandard analysis as follows (p. 204):

it's a special tool, too special, and other tools can do everything it does. It's all a matter of taste.

Katz & Katz (2010) note that

Halmos's anxiousness to evaluate Robinson's theory may have involved a conflict of interests [...] Halmos invested considerable emotional energy (and sweat, as he memorably puts it in his autobiography) into his translation of the Bernstein–Robinson result [...] [H]is blunt unflattering comments appear to retroactively justify his translationist attempt to deflect the impact of one of the first spectacular applications of Robinson's theory.

== Comments by Bos and Medvedev ==
Leibniz historian Henk Bos (1974) acknowledged that Robinson's hyperreals provide

[a] preliminary explanation of why the calculus could develop on the insecure foundation of the acceptance of infinitely small and infinitely large quantities.

F. Medvedev (1998) further points out that

[n]onstandard analysis makes it possible to answer a delicate question bound up with earlier approaches to the history of classical analysis. If infinitely small and infinitely large magnitudes are regarded as inconsistent notions, how could they [have] serve[d] as a basis for the construction of so [magnificent] an edifice of one of the most important mathematical disciplines?

== See also ==
- Constructive nonstandard analysis
- Influence of nonstandard analysis
