= Sgro =

Sgro is an Italian surname, from the medieval Greek sgouros meaning "curly". People with the surname include:

- Chris Sgro, American political strategist.
- Giovanni Sgro, Australian politician and former Member of the Victorian Legislative Council.
- Joseph Sgro, American mathematician, neurologist / neurophysiologist, and an engineering technologist / entrepreneur.
- Judy Sgro, Canadian politician and member of the House of Commons of Canada.
