= Howard Jerome Keisler =

American mathematician (born 1936)

Howard Keisler
- Born: December 3, 1936 (age 89); Seattle, United States
- Known for: Non-standard analysis
- Scientific career
- Fields: Mathematics
- Workplaces: University of Wisconsin-Madison
- Doctoral advisor: Alfred Tarski
- Doctoral students: Frederick Rowbottom; Kim Bruce; Sergio Fajardo; Solomon Garfunkel; Joseph Sgro; Rade Živaljević

Howard Jerome Keisler (born 3 December 1936) is an American mathematician, currently professor emeritus at University of Wisconsin–Madison. His research has included model theory and non-standard analysis.

His Ph.D. advisor was Alfred Tarski at Berkeley; his dissertation is Ultraproducts and Elementary Classes (1961).

Following Abraham Robinson's work resolving what had long been thought to be inherent logical contradictions in the literal interpretation of Leibniz's notation that Leibniz himself had proposed, that is, interpreting "dx" as literally representing an infinitesimally small quantity, Keisler published Elementary Calculus: An Infinitesimal Approach, a first-year calculus textbook conceptually centered on the use of infinitesimals, rather than the epsilon, delta approach, for developing the calculus.

He is also known for extending the Henkin construction (of Leon Henkin) to what are now called Henkin–Keisler models. He is also known for the Rudin–Keisler ordering along with Mary Ellen Rudin.

He held the named chair of Vilas Professor of Mathematics at Wisconsin.

Among Keisler's graduate students, several have made notable mathematical contributions, including Frederick Rowbottom who discovered Rowbottom cardinals. Several others have gone on to careers in computer science research and product development, including: Michael Benedikt, a professor of computer science at the University of Oxford, Kevin J. Compton, a professor of computer science at the University of Michigan, Curtis Tuckey, a developer of software-based collaboration environments; Joseph Sgro, a neurologist and developer of vision processor hardware and software, and Edward L. Wimmers, a database researcher at IBM Almaden Research Center.

In 2012 he became a fellow of the American Mathematical Society.

His son Jeffrey Keisler is a Fulbright Distinguished Chair at the University of Massachusetts, Boston, College of Management.

== Publications ==
- Chang, C. C.; Keisler, H. J. Continuous Model Theory. Annals of Mathematics Studies, 58, Princeton University Press, 1966. xii+165 pp.
- Model Theory for Infinitary Logic, North-Holland, 1971
- Chang, C. C.; Keisler, H. J. Model theory. Third edition. Studies in Logic and the Foundations of Mathematics, 73. North-Holland Publishing Co., Amsterdam, 1990. xvi+650 pp. ISBN 0-444-88054-2; 1st edition 1973; 2nd edition 1977
- Elementary Calculus: An Infinitesimal Approach. Prindle, Weber & Schmidt, 1976/1986. Available online at .
- An Infinitesimal Approach to Stochastic Analysis, American Mathematical Society Memoirs, 1984
- Keisler, H. J.; Robbin, Joel. Mathematical Logic and Computability, McGraw-Hill, 1996
- Fajardo, Sergio; Keisler, H. J. Model Theory of Stochastic Processes, Lecture Notes in Logic, Association for Symbolic Logic. 2002

== See also ==
- Criticism of non-standard analysis
- Non-standard calculus
- Elementary Calculus: An Infinitesimal Approach
- Influence of non-standard analysis
