= Elementary Calculus: An Infinitesimal Approach =

1976 mathematics textbook by H. Jerome Keisler

- Second edition
- Author: H. Jerome Keisler
- Language: English
- Subject: Mathematics
- Publisher: Dover
- Publication date: 1976

Elementary Calculus: An Infinitesimal approach is a textbook by H. Jerome Keisler. The subtitle alludes to the infinitesimal numbers of the hyperreal number system of Abraham Robinson and is sometimes given as An approach using infinitesimals. The book is available freely online and is currently published by Dover.

== Textbook ==
Keisler's textbook is based on Robinson's construction of the hyperreal numbers. Keisler also published a companion book, Foundations of Infinitesimal Calculus, for instructors, which covers the foundational material in more depth.

Keisler defines all basic notions of the calculus such as continuity, derivative, and integral using infinitesimals. The usual definitions in terms of ε–δ techniques are provided at the end of Chapter 5 to enable a transition to a standard sequence.

In his textbook, Keisler used the pedagogical technique of an infinite-magnification microscope, so as to represent graphically, distinct hyperreal numbers infinitely close to each other. Similarly, an infinite-resolution telescope is used to represent infinite numbers.

When one examines a curve, say the graph of ƒ, under a magnifying glass, its curvature decreases proportionally to the magnification power of the lens. Similarly, an infinite-magnification microscope will transform an infinitesimal arc of a graph of ƒ, into a straight line, up to an infinitesimal error (only visible by applying a higher-magnification "microscope"). The derivative of ƒ is then the (standard part of the) slope of that line (see figure).

The standard part function "rounds off" a finite hyperreal to the nearest real number. The "infinitesimal microscope" is used to view an infinitesimal neighborhood of a standard real.

Thus the microscope is used as a device in explaining the derivative.

== Reception ==
The book was first reviewed by Errett Bishop, noted for his work in constructive mathematics. Bishop's review was harshly critical; see Criticism of nonstandard analysis. Shortly after, Martin Davis and Hausner published a detailed favorable review, as did Andreas Blass and Keith Stroyan. Keisler's student K. Sullivan, as part of her PhD thesis, performed a controlled experiment involving 5 schools, which found Elementary Calculus to have advantages over the standard method of teaching calculus. Despite the benefits described by Sullivan, the vast majority of mathematicians have not adopted infinitesimal methods in their teaching. Recently, Katz & Katz give a positive account of a calculus course based on Keisler's book. O'Donovan also described his experience teaching calculus using infinitesimals. His initial point of view was positive, but later he found pedagogical difficulties with the approach to nonstandard calculus taken by this text and others.

G. R. Blackley remarked in a letter to Prindle, Weber & Schmidt, concerning Elementary Calculus: An Approach Using Infinitesimals, "Such problems as might arise with the book will be political. It is revolutionary. Revolutions are seldom welcomed by the established party, although revolutionaries often are."

Hrbacek writes that the definitions of continuity, derivative, and integral implicitly must be grounded in the ε–δ method in Robinson's theoretical framework, in order to extend definitions to include nonstandard values of the inputs, claiming that the hope that nonstandard calculus could be done without ε–δ methods could not be realized in full. Błaszczyk et al. detail the usefulness of microcontinuity in developing a transparent definition of uniform continuity, and characterize Hrbacek's criticism as a "dubious lament".

== Transfer principle ==
Between the first and second edition of the Elementary Calculus, much of the theoretical material that was in the first chapter was moved to the epilogue at the end of the book, including the theoretical groundwork of nonstandard analysis.

In the second edition Keisler introduces the extension principle and the transfer principle in the following form:

Every real statement that holds for one or more particular real functions holds for the hyperreal natural extensions of these functions.

Keisler then gives a few examples of real statements to which the principle applies:

- Closure law for addition: for any x and y, the sum x + y is defined.
- Commutative law for addition: x + y = y + x.
- A rule for order: if 0 < x < y then 0 < 1/y < 1/x.
- Division by zero is never allowed: x/0 is undefined.
- An algebraic identity: $(x-y)^2 = x^2-2xy+y^2$.
- A trigonometric identity: $\sin^2 x + \cos^2 x = 1$.
- A rule for logarithms: If x > 0 and y > 0, then $\log_{10} (xy) = \log_{10}x + \log_{10}y$.

== See also ==
- Criticism of nonstandard analysis
- Influence of nonstandard analysis
- Nonstandard calculus
- Increment theorem
