= Nigel Cutland =

British mathematician and professor

Nigel J. Cutland is Professor of Mathematics at the University of York. His main fields of interest are non-standard analysis, Loeb spaces, and applications in probability and stochastic analysis. He was Editor-in-Chief of Logic and Analysis and Journal of Logic and Analysis.

== Books ==
- Cutland, Nigel (1980). Computability: An Introduction to Recursive Function Theory. Cambridge University Press. ISBN 9780521294652.
- Capinski, Marek; Nigel Cutland (1995). Nonstandard Methods in Stochastic Fluid Mechanics (Series on Advances in Mathematics for Applied Sciences). World Scientific Pub Co Inc. ISBN 9789810217105.
- Cutland, Nigel (2000). Loeb Measures in Practice: Recent Advances: EMS Lectures 1997 (Lecture Notes in Mathematics). Springer. ISBN 9783540413844.

== See also ==
- Influence of non-standard analysis
