= Kim Bruce =

American computer scientist

- Education: Pomona College (BA, MA) University of Wisconsin-Madison (PhD)
- Known for: Programming language design and implementation
- Scientific career
- Workplaces: Williams College; Pomona College
- Doctoral advisor: H. Jerome Keisler

Kim B. Bruce is an American computer scientist. He is the Emeritus Reuben C. and Eleanor Winslow Professor of Computer Science at Pomona College, and was previously the Frederick Latimer Wells Professor of Computer Science at Williams College. He helped establish the computer science departments at both institutions. His work focuses on the design of programming languages.

== Early life and education ==
Bruce attended Pomona College, where he obtained a BA and an MA. He then received his doctorate from the University of Wisconsin–Madison.

== Career ==
Bruce was the Frederick Latimer Wells Professor of Computer Science at Williams College for 28 years. He then moved to teach at his alma mater, Pomona. In 2019, he was elected an ACM Distinguished Member.
