= Adriaan Cornelis Zaanen =

Dutch mathematician (1913–2003)

Aad Zaanen
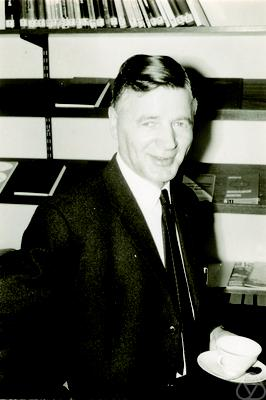
- Zaanen in 1967
- Born: Adriaan Cornelis Zaanen; 14 June 1913; Rotterdam, Netherlands
- Died: 1 April 2003 (aged 89); Wassenaar, Netherlands
- Education: Leiden University
- Known for: Contributions to the theory of Riesz spaces
- Spouse: Ada van der Woude
- Awards: Member of the Royal Netherlands Academy of Arts and Sciences (1960); Knight of the Order of the Netherlands Lion (1982); Honorary member of the Dutch Mathematical Society (1988)
- Scientific career
- Fields: Functional analysis
- Workplaces: Bandung Institute of Technology; Delft University of Technology; Leiden University
- Doctoral advisor: Johannes Droste
- Doctoral students: W.A.J. Luxemburg, M.A. Kaashoek

Adriaan Cornelis "Aad" Zaanen (14 June 1913 in Rotterdam – 1 April 2003 in Wassenaar) was a Dutch mathematician working in analysis. He is known for his books on Riesz spaces (together with Wim Luxemburg).

== Biography ==
Zaanen was born in Rotterdam, where he attended the Hogere Burgerschool. He graduated in 1930 with excellent marks, and started his studies in mathematics at Leiden University. Having obtained his master's degree in 1935, he did research under the guidance of his doctoral advisor Johannes Droste, and was awarded a Ph.D. in 1938. His doctoral thesis dealt with the convergence of series of eigenvalues of boundary value problems of the Sturm–Liouville type. The same year he was appointed a mathematics teacher at the Hogere Burgerschool in Rotterdam, a profession that he continued until 1947.

In the next years and also in the period of the German occupation of the Netherlands, Zaanen continued to do mathematical research in his spare time. He studied Stefan Banach's Théorie des Opérations Linéaires, the book that laid the foundations of functional analysis, and Marshall H. Stone's Linear Transformations in Hilbert Space. During this period he wrote nine scientific papers on integral equations with symmetrisable kernels that were published in the Proceedings of the Royal Netherlands Academy of Arts and Sciences in 1946–47.

In parallel to his job as a secondary-school teacher, Zaanen was appointed in 1946 as a mathematics teacher for three hours per week at the Technische Hogeschool Delft, and as an unpaid privaatdocent at Leiden University where he taught a course on Lebesgue integration.

In 1947 Zaanen accepted the position of Professor of Mathematics at the Technische Hogeschool Bandoeng. In 1950 he returned to the Netherlands where he was appointed Professor of Mathematics at the Technische Hogeschool Delft. In these years he continued his work on the book Linear Analysis, which was published in 1953 and for years was a prominent work on functional analysis and the theory of integral equations.

In 1956 Zaanen was appointed Professor of Mathematics at Leiden University. There he started a large research programme into the theory of Riesz spaces, together with his first doctoral student Wim Luxemburg, Professor of Mathematics at the California Institute of Technology. Most of their results were published in a series of papers in the Proceedings of the Royal Netherlands Academy of Arts and Sciences. Unusually for mathematics research in the Netherlands at the time, Zaanen pursued a long-term research programme involving a number of collaborators and doctoral students. Eight doctoral theses on various topics in the theory of Riesz spaces were produced in this school.

Zaanen took retirement in 1982.

== Publications ==
Zaanen published almost 70 papers in scientific journals and reviewed conference proceedings. He is however best known for four large books that each took a prominent place in scientific literature:

- A.C. Zaanen, Linear Analysis, North-Holland Publishing Company, Amsterdam and P. Noordhoff, Groningen (1953, 1957, 1960), 600 pages
- Adriaan Cornelis Zaanen, Integration, North-Holland Publishing Company, Amsterdam (1967) 604 pages. Revised and enlarged edition of An Introduction to the Theory of Integration (1958, 1961, 1965).
- W.A.J. Luxemburg and A.C. Zaanen, Riesz Spaces Volume I, North-Holland Publishing Company, Amsterdam London (1971), 514 pages
- A.C. Zaanen, Riesz Spaces II, North-Holland Publishing Company, Amsterdam New York Oxford (1983), 720 pages

== Other functions and honours ==
Zaanen was elected a member of the Royal Netherlands Academy of Arts and Sciences in 1960.

He served as President of the Dutch Mathematical Society from 1970 until 1972. He was an editor of the Society's journal Nieuw Archief voor Wiskunde from 1953 until 1982. In 1988 he was appointed an honorary member of the Society.

He served as a member of the Curatorium of the Mathematisch Centrum from 1965 until 1979.

On his retirement in 1982 Zaanen was appointed Knight of the Order of the Netherlands Lion.
