= Robert Goldblatt =

New Zealand mathematician

Robert Ian Goldblatt (born 1949) is a mathematical logician who is emeritus Professor in the School of Mathematics and Statistics at Victoria University, Wellington, New Zealand. His doctoral advisor was Max Cresswell. His most popular books are Logics of Time and Computation and Topoi: the Categorial Analysis of Logic. He has also written a graduate level textbook on hyperreal numbers which is an introduction to nonstandard analysis.

In 1987 he published a study on hyperbolic orthogonality, the geometry of relativity of simultaneity.

He has been Coordinating Editor of The Journal of Symbolic Logic and a Managing Editor of Studia Logica. He was elected Fellow and Councillor of the Royal Society of New Zealand, President of the New Zealand Mathematical Society, and represented New Zealand to the International Mathematical Union. In 2012 the Royal Society of New Zealand awarded him the Jones Medal for lifetime achievement in mathematics.

== Books and handbook chapters ==
- 1979: Topoi: The Categorial Analysis of Logic, North-Holland. Revised edition 1984. Dover Publications edition 2006. Internet edition, Project Euclid.

Benjamin C. Pierce recommends it as an "excellent beginner book", praising it for the use of simple set-theoretic examples and motivating intuitions, but noted that it "is sometimes criticized by category theorists for being misleading on some aspects of the subject, and for presenting long and difficult proofs where simple ones are available." But the preface of the Dover edition observes (p. xv) that "This is a book about logic, rather than category theory per se. It aims to explain, in an introductory way, how certain logical ideas are illuminated by a category-theoretic perspective."

- 1982: Axiomatising the Logic of Computer Programming, Lecture Notes in Computer Science 130, Springer-Verlag.
- 1987: Orthogonality and Spacetime Geometry, Universitext Springer-Verlag ISBN 0-387-96519-X MR 0888161
- 1987: Logics of Time and Computation. CSLI Lecture Notes, 7. Stanford University, Center for the Study of Language and Information MR 1191162. Second edition 1992.
- 1993: Mathematics of Modality, CSLI Publications, ISBN 978-1-881526-24-7 MR 1317099
- 1998: Lectures on the Hyperreals: An Introduction to Nonstandard Analysis. Graduate Texts in Mathematics, 188. Springer-Verlag.

Reviewer Perry Smith for MathSciNet wrote: "The author's ideas on how to achieve both intelligibility and rigor, explained in the preface, will be useful reading for anyone intending to teach nonstandard analysis."

- 2006: "Mathematical Modal Logic: a View of its Evolution" in Modalities in the Twentieth Century, Volume 7 of the Handbook of the History of Logic, edited by Dov M. Gabbay and John Woods, Elsevier, pp. 1–98.
- 2011: Quantifiers, Propositions and Identity: Admissible Semantics for Quantified Modal and Substructural Logics, Cambridge University Press and the Association for Symbolic Logic.

== See also ==
- Influence of non-standard analysis
