= Frederick Rowbottom =

British logician and mathematician (1938-2009)

Frederick Rowbottom (16 January 1938 – 12 October 2009) was a British logician and mathematician. The large cardinal notion of Rowbottom cardinals is named after him.

== Biography ==
Rowbottom was educated at Glossop Grammar School (now Glossopdale School) in High Peak, Derbyshire, and King's College, Cambridge, where he graduated with a degree in mathematics in 1960. Upon leaving Cambridge, he studied under Howard Jerome Keisler at the University of Wisconsin–Madison, earning his Ph.D. degree in 1964, with a thesis entitled Large Cardinals and Small Constructible Sets, under the supervision of Jerome Keisler. With a recommendation from Georg Kreisel, he took a position at the University of Bristol in 1965, where he spent the rest of his professional career.

He published a paper called "Some strong axioms of infinity incompatible with the axiom of constructibility" in the Annals of Mathematical Logic, 3 1971. This paper, together with his thesis, "showed that Ramsey cardinals were weaker than measurable cardinals, and that their existence implied the constructible real continuum was countable; he further proved that this followed also from weaker partition and two cardinal properties." The large cardinal notion of Rowbottom cardinals is named after him, as is the notion of a Rowbottom ultrafilter.

Keith Devlin studied set theory under Rowbottom. In 1992 he and a student, Jonathan Chapman, wrote a textbook on topos theory, Relative Category Theory and Geometric Morphisms: A Logical Approach, published in Oxford Logic Guides, No. 16. Rowbottom retired in 1993 at the age of 55.

Rowbottom died of heart failure in Hadfield, Derbyshire, England, on 12 October 2009, aged 71.
