= Joseph A. Wolf =

American mathematician (1936–2023)

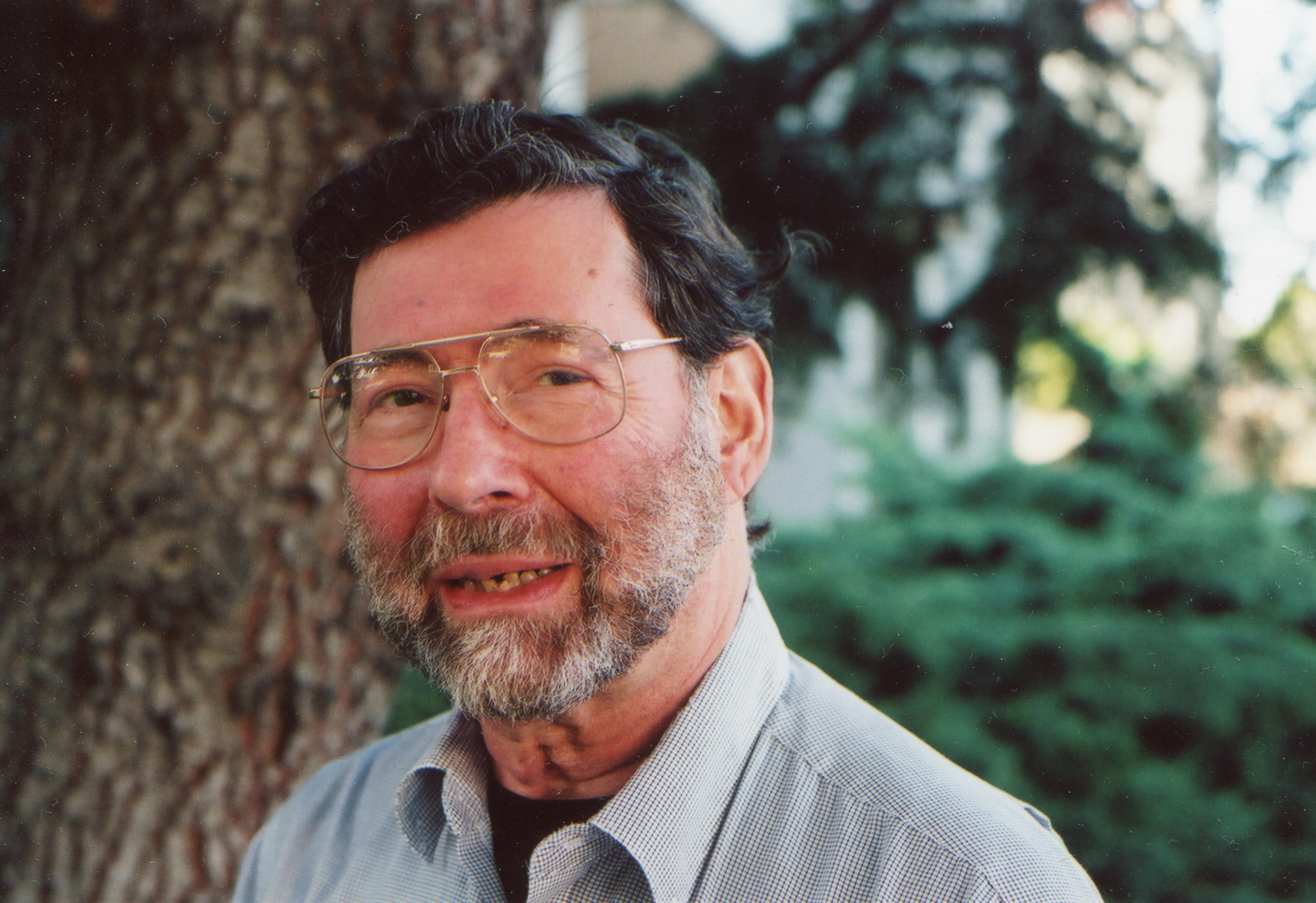
- Wolf in 2005
- Born: October 18, 1936; Chicago, Illinois, U.S.
- Died: August 14, 2023 (aged 86)
- Education: University of Chicago
- Awards: Humboldt Research Award
- Scientific career
- Fields: Mathematics
- Workplaces: Institute for Advanced Study; University of California, Berkeley
- Doctoral advisor: Shiing-Shen Chern

Joseph Albert Wolf (October 18, 1936 – August 14, 2023) was an American mathematician at the University of California, Berkeley.

== Life and career ==
Wolf graduated from at the University of Chicago with a bachelor's degree in 1956 and with his master's degree in 1957 and his Ph.D. under the supervision of Shiing-Shen Chern in 1959 (On the manifolds covered by a given compact, connected Riemannian homogeneous manifold). From 1960 to 1962, as a post-doctoral researcher, he was at the Institute for Advanced Study in Princeton, New Jersey (and again from 1965 to 1966). In 1962 he was assistant professor and since 1966 he has been professor at Berkeley.

Wolf considered applications of group theory to differential geometry and complex manifolds and applications of harmonic analysis to the theory of elementary particles and control theory. In 1994 he received the Humboldt Research Award and in 1977 the Medal of the University of Liège. In 1989 he received an honorary professorship at the National University of Cordoba in Argentina. From 1972 to 1973 and from 1983 to 1984, he was a Miller Research Professor in Berkeley.

Wolf was a fellow of the American Mathematical Society and member of the Swiss Mathematical Society. From 1965 to 1967 he was a Sloan Fellow. He held a Miller Research Professorship twice, in the 1972–73 and 1983–84 academic years.

Joseph A. Wolf died on August 14, 2023, at the age of 86.

== Writings ==
- Spaces of constant curvature, McGraw Hill 1967, 6. Edition AMS Chelsea Publ. 2011 ISBN 978-0-8218-5282-8
- Harmonic analysis on commutative spaces, American Mathematical Society, Mathematical Surveys and Monographs, Vol. 142, 2007
- Spherical functions on Euclidean space, J. Funct. Anal., volume 239, 2006, pp. 127–136 arXiv:math/0509459
- With Gregor Fels, Alan Huckleberry Cycle spaces of flag domains: a complex geometric viewpoint, Progress in Mathematics 245, Birkhäuser, 2006
  - Huckleberry, Alan T.; Wolf, Joseph A. (2002). "Cycle Spaces of Flag Domains: A Complex Geometric Viewpoint". arXiv:math/0210445.
- Classification and fourier inversion for parabolic subgroups with square integrable nilradical, Memoirs AMS 225, 1979
- Unitary representations of maximal parabolic subgroups of the classical groups, Memoirs AMS 180, 1976
- Representations on partially holomorphic cohomology spaces, Memoirs AMS 138, 1974
- Editor Harmonic analysis and representations of semisimple Lie groups, (NATO Advanced Study Institute, Lüttich 1977), Reidel 1980
- Principal series representations of direct limit groups, Compositio Mathematica, v. 141 (2005), pp. 1504–1530. arXiv:math/0402283
- Complex forms of quaternionic symmetric spaces, in Complex, contact and symmetric manifolds, Progress in Mathematics 234, Birkhäuser 2005, pp. 265–277 arXiv:math/0308283
- Locally symmetric homogeneous spaces, Comm. Math. Helvetici, volume 37, 1962, pp. 65–101 doi:10.1007/BF02566963
- Self adjoint function spaces on Riemannian symmetric manifolds, Transactions AMS, volume 113, 1964, pp. 299–315 doi:10.1090/S0002-9947-1964-0170982-7
