= Peter A. Loeb =

American mathematician (1937–2024)

Peter Albert Loeb (July 3, 1937 – November 20, 2024) was a mathematician at the University of Illinois at Urbana–Champaign.

Loeb was born in Berkeley, California and studied at Reed College (1955–1958) and Harvey Mudd College, where he obtained a B.S. in mathematics in 1959. He received his MS at Princeton University in 1961, and his PhD in mathematics from Stanford University in 1964 with a thesis supervised by Halsey Royden with a thesis titled An Axiomatic Treatment of Pairs of Elliptic Differential Equations.

He first became professor at the University of California, Los Angeles and in 1968 he took the position of assistant professor at the Mathematics Department of the University of Illinois where he remained for the rest of his career, from 1975 to 2008 as full professor and since then as professor emeritus.

Loeb's research covered a wide range of topics, mainly in potential theory, measure theory, functional analysis, and topology.

He co-authored a basic reference text on nonstandard analysis (Hurd–Loeb 1985). Reviewer Perry Smith for MathSciNet wrote:

This book is a welcome addition to the literature on nonstandard analysis.

The notion of Loeb measure named after him has become a standard tool in the field and is considered "likely to be his most enduring legacy".

Loeb supervised six PhD theses, among that of Sun Yeneng.

In 2012 Loeb became a fellow of the American Mathematical Society.

Loeb died of a brain tumor at home in Urbana on November 20, 2024. He was survived by his wife of 66 years and their three children.

== See also ==
- Influence of nonstandard analysis

== Publications ==
- Hurd, Albert E.; Loeb, Peter A. An introduction to nonstandard real analysis. Pure and Applied Mathematics, 118. Academic Press, Inc., Orlando, FL, 1985.
- Loeb, Peter A. "Conversion from nonstandard to standard measure spaces and applications in probability theory". Trans. Amer. Math. Soc. 211 (1975), 113–122.
- Loeb, Peter A. "A new proof of the Tychonoff theorem". American Mathematical Monthly 72 1965 711–717.
- Bliedtner, J.; Loeb, P. "A reduction technique for limit theorems in analysis and probability theory". Ark. Mat. 30 (1992), no. 1, 25–43.
- Loeb, Peter A. "Weak limits of measures and the standard part map". Proceedings of the American Mathematical Society 77 (1979), no. 1, 128–135.
- Füredi, Zoltán; Loeb, Peter A. "On the best constant for the Besicovitch covering theorem". Proc. Amer. Math. Soc. 121 (1994), no. 4, 1063–1073.
- Loeb, Peter A. "A nonstandard functional approach to Fubini's theorem". Proc. Amer. Math. Soc. 93 (1985), no. 2, 343–346.
- Loeb, Peter; Sun, Yeneng: "Purification of measure-valued maps". Illinois Journal of Mathematics 50 (2006), no. 1-4, 747–762.
- Loeb, Peter A.; Osswald, Horst "Nonstandard integration theory in topological vector lattices". Monatsch. Math. 124 (1997), no. 1, 53–82.
- Loeb, Peter A. "An axiomatic treatment of pairs of elliptic differential equations". Annales de l'Institut Fourier (Grenoble) 16 1966 fasc. 2, 167–208.
