= Robert M. Anderson (mathematician) =

American mathematician

- Born: 1951 (age 74–75); Toronto, Canada
- Education: University of Toronto (BSc); Yale University (PhD)
- Awards: Graham and Dodd Scroll Award for excellence in research and financial writing (2012), Financial Analysts Journal; Fellow of the Econometric Society (1987); Alfred P. Sloan Research Fellowship (1982); Prince of Wales Scholarship, University of Toronto (1969)
- Scientific career
- Fields: Mathematical economics, Mathematical Finance
- Workplaces: University of California, Berkeley; Princeton University
- Doctoral advisor: Shizuo Kakutani

Robert Murdoch Anderson (born 1951) is Professor of Economics and of Mathematics at the University of California, Berkeley. He is director of the Center for Risk Management Research, University of California, Berkeley and he was chair of the University of California Academic Senate 2011–12. He is also the co-director for the Consortium for Data Analytics in Risk at UC Berkeley.

== Research ==
Anderson's nonstandard construction of Brownian motion is a single object which, when viewed from a nonstandard perspective, has all the formal properties of a discrete random walk; however, when viewed from a measure-theoretic perspective, it is a standard Brownian motion. This permits a pathwise definition of the Itô Integral and pathwise solutions of stochastic differential equations.

Anderson's contributions to mathematical economics are primarily within General Equilibrium Theory. Some of this work uses nonstandard analysis, but much of it provides simple elementary treatments that generalize work that had originally been done using sophisticated mathematical machinery. The best known of these papers is the 1978 Econometrica article cited, which establishes by elementary means a very general theorem on the cores of exchange economies.

In the 2008 Econometrica article cited, Anderson and Raimondo provide the first satisfactory proof of existence of equilibrium in a continuous-time securities market with more than one agent. The paper also provides a convergence theorem relating the equilibria of discrete-time securities markets to those of continuous-time securities markets. It uses Anderson's nonstandard construction of Brownian and properties of real analytic functions.

Recently, Anderson has focused on the analysis of investment strategies, and his work relies on both theoretical considerations and empirical analysis. In an article published in the Financial Analysts Journal in 2012 and cited below, Anderson, Bianchi and Goldberg found that long-term returns to risk parity strategies, which have acquired tens of billions of dollars in assets under management after the 2008 financial crisis, are not materially different from the returns to more transparent strategies once realistic financing and trading costs are taken into account; they do well in some periods and poorly in others. A subsequent investigation by the same research team found that returns to dynamically levered strategies such as risk parity are highly unpredictable due to high sensitivity of strategy performance to a key risk factor: the co-movement of leverage with return to the underlying portfolio that is levered.

== Selected publications ==
- Anderson, Robert M.: A nonstandard representation for Brownian motion and Ito integration. Israel Journal of Mathematics 25(1976), 15–46.
- Anderson, Robert M.: An elementary core equivalence theorem. Econometrica 46(1978), 1483–1487.
- Anderson, Robert M. and Salim Rashid: A Nonstandard Characterization of Weak Convergence, Proceedings of the American Mathematical Society 69(1978), 327-332
- Anderson, Robert M.: Star-finite representations of measure spaces. Trans. Amer. Math. Soc. 271 (1982), no. 2, 667–687.

MathSciNet review: "In nonstandard analysis, *-finite sets are infinite sets which nonetheless possess the formal properties of finite sets. They permit a synthesis of continuous and discrete theories in many areas of mathematics, including probability theory, functional analysis, and mathematical economics. *-finite models are particularly useful in building new models of economic or probabilistic processes." here

- Anderson, Robert M.: Nonstandard analysis with applications to economics. Handbook of mathematical economics, Vol. IV, 2145–2208, Handbooks in Econom. 1, North-Holland, Amsterdam, 1991.
- Anderson, Robert M. and William R. Zame: Genericity with Infinitely Many Parameters, Advances in Theoretical Economics 1(2001), Article 1.
- Anderson, Robert M. and Roberto C. Raimondo: Equilibrium in continuous-time financial markets: Endogenously dynamically complete markets, Econometrica 76(2008), 841–907.
- Anderson, Robert M., Stephen W. Bianchi and Lisa R. Goldberg: Will My Risk Parity Strategy Outperform? Financial Analysts Journal 68(2012), no. 6, 75–93.

== Personal life ==
Anderson is gay and has worked to attain greater equality for same-sex couples in academia. In 1991, he spoke at the Stanford University Faculty Senate, countering the claims of committee chair Professor Alain Enthoven that granting the same benefits to domestic partners of gay faculty members as to the spouses of heterosexual faculty would cost the university millions of dollars and thus be untenable.

As the Chair of the University of California Academic Council during the Occupy Wall Street protests of 2011, Anderson also spoke out against police violence on the campus of UC Davis, pledging the Council's "opposition to the state’s disinvestment in higher education, which is at the root of the student protests."

== See also ==
- Influence of non-standard analysis
