= Increment theorem =

In nonstandard analysis, a field of mathematics, the increment theorem states the following: Suppose a function y = f(x) is differentiable at x and that Δx is infinitesimal. Then $\Delta y = f'(x)\,\Delta x + \varepsilon\, \Delta x$ for some infinitesimal ε, where $\Delta y=f(x+\Delta x)-f(x).$

If $\Delta x \neq 0$ then we may write $\frac{\Delta y}{\Delta x} = f'(x) + \varepsilon,$ which implies that $\frac{\Delta y}{\Delta x}\approx f'(x)$, or in other words that $\frac{\Delta y}{\Delta x}$ is infinitely close to $f'(x)$, or $f'(x)$ is the standard part of $\frac{\Delta y}{\Delta x}$.

A similar theorem exists in standard Calculus. Again assume that y = f(x) is differentiable, but now let Δx be a nonzero standard real number. Then the same equation $\Delta y = f'(x)\,\Delta x + \varepsilon\, \Delta x$ holds with the same definition of Δy, but instead of ε being infinitesimal, we have $\lim_{\Delta x \to 0} \varepsilon = 0$ (treating x and f as given so that ε is a function of Δx alone).

== See also ==
- Nonstandard calculus
- Elementary Calculus: An Infinitesimal Approach
- Abraham Robinson
- Taylor's theorem
