= MathWorks Math Modeling Challenge =

- Genre: Mathematical modeling challenge
- Frequency: Annual
- Inaugurated: 2006
- Organizer: Society for Industrial and Applied Mathematics
- Sponsor: MathWorks
- Website: m3challenge.siam.org

MathWorks Math Modeling Challenge (M3 Challenge) is a mathematical modeling competition open to high schools in the U.S. (including US territories and DoDEA schools) and schools with sixth form students (age 16-19) in England and Wales. It is sponsored by MathWorks (a developer of mathematical computing software) based in Boston and organized by the Society for Industrial and Applied Mathematics (SIAM) based in Philadelphia.

M3 Challenge awards $100,000 in scholarship prizes each year to the top teams. Additional incentives are expenses-paid trips for top performing teams to the final event in New York City each April, and media recognition that the winning teams receive. Some examples of recognition: the winning paper from 2008 was published in the College Mathematics Journal. A representative from High Tech's team appeared on FOX Business Channel, 2010 winners were interviewed by Pimm Fox of Bloomberg radio, presented its findings at Lockheed Martin's Data Capture Center, and met with U.S. Census Bureau Director Dr. Robert Groves. Many Champion teams have had their solution papers and research published in SIAM's undergraduate publication, SIAM Undergraduate Research Online (SIURO). The 2011 and 2012 winners were interviewed by Pimm Fox of Bloomberg radio, and the 2014 winners were interviewed by both Pimm Fox and Carol Massar on Bloomberg radio. Many local and regional TV and radio stations interview top teams; and in 2021 both NPR and the BBC interviewed top teams about their work and the problem topic of defeating the digital divide and making internet accessible to all.

MathWorks took over sponsorship of the competition, formerly known as the Moody's Mega Math (M³) Challenge, from Moody's Foundation in 2017.

== Registration process ==
Registration is open to high school juniors and seniors or sixth form students (age 16-19) in eligible areas as well as to homeschooled and cyber schooled students. Teams consist of three to five students and one coach, who must be a teacher at their school. Each school can have a maximum of two teams. There is no cost to register or participate in the Challenge.

== Eligibility ==
High schools in the U.S. (including US territories and DoDEA schools) are eligible. Schools with sixth form students (age 16-19) in England and Wales are eligible.

== Challenge weekend ==
The M3 Challenge is held annually on a Friday, Saturday, Sunday, and Monday in late February or early March. Students choose which day and what continuous span of 14 hours that they wish to work over Challenge weekend. All teams will work in, or convert their local time to, Eastern Standard Time. Once the problem is downloaded, the clock starts and it cannot be paused; students should download the problem with at least fourteen hours before the firm end of Challenge weekend to have use of the full fourteen hours allowed. They can work from any location they choose. Teacher-coaches are not required to be physically with or near the team during Challenge weekend. Team members may not discuss any aspect of the problem with, nor seek help from via any means or method, the coach or anyone other than their teammates over Challenge weekend.

== The problem ==
Professional Ph.D.-level applied mathematicians devise and write the Challenge problem. Students have no knowledge of the problem before they download it on Challenge weekend. To solve the problem, they are allowed to use any inanimate and publicly available sources. They cannot have any outside help from anyone, including their teacher-coach. A helpful discussion forum leading up to the problem release, a practice problem with live text chat discussion, can be found here. Below are previous problems:

2006 Problem – Solving the Social Security Stalemate
2007 Problem – Beat the Street!
2008 Problem – Energy Independence Meets the Law of Unintended Consequences
2009 Problem – $787 Billion: Will the Stimulus Act Stimulate the U.S. Economy
2010 Problem – Making Sense of the 2010 Census
2011 Problem – Colorado River Water: Good to the Last Acre-Foot
2012 Problem – All Aboard: Can High Speed Rail Get Back on Track?
2013 Problem – Waste Not, Want Not: Putting Recyclables in Their Place
2014 Problem – Lunch Crunch: Can Nutritious Be Affordable and Delicious?
2015 Problem – Stem Sells: What is Higher Education Really Worth?
2016 Problem – Share and (Car) Share Alike – Modeling New Approaches to Mobility
2017 Problem – From Sea to Shining Sea: Looking Ahead with the National Park Service
2018 Problem – Better Ate Than Never: Reducing Food Waste
2019 Problem – One is Too Many and A Thousand Not Enough: Substance Use and Abuse
2020 Problem – Keep On Trucking: U.S. Big Rigs Turnover From Diesel to Electric
2021 Problem – Defeating the Digital Divide: Internet Costs, Needs, and Optimal Planning
2022 Problem – Remote Work: Fad or Future
2023 Problem – Ride Like the Wind Without Getting Winded: The growth of E-Bike use
2024 Problem – A Tale of Two Crises: The Housing Shortage and Homelessness
2025 Problem – Hot Button Issue: Staying Cool as the World Heats Up

== Judging ==
Ph.D.-level applied mathematicians judge the contest in three phases. In triage, each paper is read through at least two times, and as many as five times, before being eliminated or passed on to the second round. The triage round of judging eliminates two-thirds or more of the submitted papers. In the second round of judging, papers are read up to an additional twelve times each, and the top papers emerge. The top six papers overall become Finalists and go on to the final event and presentation round of judging. The M3 Challenge Technical Computing Scholarship Award, begun in 2018, honors teams for an outstanding use of computer programming (other than spreadsheets); these awardees also are invited to and present at the final event. Judging is blind, with teams known only by a unique team ID number, until the validation and presentation round during the final event. Finalist and Technical Computing Awardee teams present their papers live to a panel of judges during the final event. Following the presentations, judges rank the teams and a formal award ceremony takes place.

== Prizes ==
All students who submit a viable solution paper receive certificates of participation, which are mailed to their teacher-coach. Coaches also receive certificates. Judges award additional semi-finalist and honorable mention team awards in amounts of $1,500 and $1,000 per team, respectively. Semi-finalist prizes are awarded to teams whose papers were highly ranked and underwent in-depth, specific discussion by judges. Honorable mention prizes are awarded to teams whose papers are judged to be worthy of recognition for their superior efforts.

The top six teams' schools are awarded trophies. Scholarship prizes for the top six finalist teams and the technical computing awardees are as follows (GBP equivalent for U.K. winning teams):

- M3 Challenge Champions (Summa Cum Laude Team Prize) $20,000
- M3 Challenge Runner Up (Magna Cum Laude Team Prize) $15,000
- M3 Challenge Third Place (Cum Laude Team Prize) $10,000
- M3 Challenge Finalist (Meritorious Team Prize) $5,000 (3 teams)
- M3 Challenge Technical Computing Winner $3000
- M3 Challenge Technical Computing Runner Up $2000
- M3 Challenge Technical Computing Third Place $1000

== Awards and recognition for the M3 Challenge ==
- SIAM received an Award of Excellence in the first round of the 2009 Associations Advance America (AAA) Awards program for its role in organizing and administering Moody's Mega Math Challenge
- Moody's Corporation received a 2008 Excellence Award from the Committee Encouraging Corporate Philanthropy (CECP)for the company's sophisticated giving program which encourages students to develop a passion for mathematics, economics and finance, and specifically citing Moody's Mega Math Challenge which aims to excite students about employing mathematics to solve real world problems.
- The M^{3} Challenge has received placement on the National Association of Secondary School Principals' National Advisory List of Student Contests & Activities since 2010.

== Resources ==
Here are some helpful resources:

- Math Modeling handbooks, one for getting started and one for adding computing
- A "how-to" video: About M3 Challenge
- Guidelines for Assessment and Instruction in Mathematical Modeling Education (GAIMME)
- Sample problems
- What is Math Modeling video series
- Learn Technical Computing
