= Mathematical Contest in Modeling =

Mathematical modeling competition for students

The International Mathematical Contest in Modeling (MCM) is a multi-day mathematical modelling competition held annually in USA, during the first or second weekend in February, since 1985 by the Consortium for Mathematics and its Applications (COMAP) and sponsored by SIAM and INFORMS. It is distinguished from other major mathematical competitions such as the famous Putnam Competition by its strong focus on research, modeling skills, mathematics, originality, teamwork, communication and justification of results. It runs concurrently with the Interdisciplinary Contest in Modeling (ICM).

The financial support initially provided by Science Foundations like National Science Foundation (NSF), Institute for Operations Research and the Management Sciences (INFORMS), Society for Industrial and Applied Mathematics (SIAM), since 2004 additional funding comes from the National Security Agency of USA (NSA) and Mathematical Association of America (MAA).

== Problems ==
At the beginning of the contest, teams have a choice between three problems. Problem A involves a system that requires the use of continuous mathematics, and thus often involves concepts from geometry, physics, or engineering. Problem B involves a system that requires the use of discrete mathematics. In 2016, a "data insights" problem was added, where teams are given access to database files and tasked with using them to answer a question. This problem was designated as Problem C, though previously, Problem C referred to an ICM problem. These problems tend to be open-ended, and are drawn from all fields of science, business, and public policy. Past problems include

- Estimate the global effects of a large asteroid impacting Antarctica (1999 A)
- Study the hunting strategies of velociraptor dinosaurs based on fossil data (1997 A)
- Develop a more efficient method of boarding passengers onto large commercial jets (2007 B)

Teams have 96 hours to research and submit their solutions in the form of a research paper. During this time, they may consult any available references, but may not discuss their problem with anyone outside their teams. Several guides containing advice and recommendations for teams and/or advisors have been published online or in print.

== Participation and awards ==
Thousands of international teams of three undergraduates compete to produce original mathematical papers in response to one of two modelling problems. Initially, participation was largely from the United States, however, in recent years international participation has grown significantly, particularly from the Korea and People's Republic of China, so that in 2007 teams from the United States comprised only 34% of total participation. In 2014, the percentage of teams from Asia reached a record high of 88.9%.

After the competition, all papers are judged and placed into the following categories:

- Unsuccessful Participant
- Successful Participant (approximately 65% of teams)
- Honorable Mention (approximately 11% of teams)
- Meritorious Winner (approximately 4% of teams)
- Outstanding Winner and Finalist (approximately 1.5% of teams)

Outstanding Winner papers were published in The UMAP Journal.

== See also ==
- International Mathematical Modeling Challenge
- List of computer simulation software
- List of mathematical art software
- Lists of mathematical software
