= Influence of nonstandard analysis =

Abraham Robinson's theory of nonstandard analysis has been applied in a number of fields.

== Probability theory ==
"Radically elementary probability theory" of Edward Nelson combines the discrete and the continuous theory through the infinitesimal approach. The model-theoretical approach of nonstandard analysis together with Loeb measure theory allows one to define Brownian motion as a hyperfinite random walk, obviating the need for cumbersome measure-theoretic developments. Jerome Keisler used this classical approach of nonstandard analysis to characterize general stochastic processes as hyperfinite ones.

== Economics ==
Economists have used nonstandard analysis to model markets with large numbers of agents (see Robert M. Anderson (economist)).

== Education ==
An article by Michèle Artigue concerns the teaching of analysis. Artigue devotes a section, "The non standard analysis and its weak impact on education" on page 172, to non-standard analysis. She writes:

The non-standard analysis revival and its weak impact on education. The publication in 1966 of Robinson's book NSA constituted in some sense a rehabilitation of infinitesimals which had fallen into disrepute [...] [Robinson's proposal] was met with suspicion, even hostility, by many mathematicians [...] Nevertheless, despite the obscurity of this first work, NSA developed rapidly [...] The attempts at simplification were often conducted with the aim of producing an elementary way of teaching NSA. This was the case with the work of Keisler and Henle-Kleinberg [...]

Artigue continues specifically with reference to the calculus textbook:

[Keisler's work] served as a reference text for a teaching experiment in the first year in university in the Chicago area in 1973-74. Sullivan used 2 questionnaires to evaluate the effects of the course, one for teachers, the other for students. The 11 teachers involved gave a very positive opinion of the experience. The student questionnaire revealed no significant difference in technical performance [...] but showed that those following the NSA course were better able to interpret the sense of the mathematical formalism of calculus [...] The appearance of the 2nd book of Keisler led to a virulent criticism by Bishop, accusing Keisler of seeking [...] to convince students that mathematics is only "an esoteric and meaningless exercise in technique", detached from any reality. These criticisms were in opposition to the declarations of the partisans of NSA who affirmed with great passion its simplicity and intuitive character. [...] However, it is necessary to emphasize the weak impact of NSA on contemporary education. The small number of reported instances of this approach are often accompanied with passionate advocacy, but this rarely rises above the level of personal conviction.

== Authors of books on hyperreals ==
- Sergio Albeverio
- Robert M. Anderson (economist)
- Leif Arkeryd
- Vieri Benci
- Nigel Cutland
- Martin Davis
- Jens Erik Fenstad
- Robert Goldblatt
- Reuben Hersh
- Raphael Høegh-Krohn
- Karel Hrbáček
- Vladimir Kanovei
- H. Jerome Keisler
- Semen Samsonovich Kutateladze
- Peter Loeb
- Wilhelmus Luxemburg
- Edward Nelson
- Alain M. Robert
- Abraham Robinson
- Keith Stroyan
- Terence Tao

== See also ==
- Criticism of nonstandard analysis

== Bibliography ==
- Zdzislaw Pawlak: Rough set approach to knowledge-based decision support. European Journal of Operational Research Volume 99, Issue 1, 16 May 1997, Pages 48–57.
- Melvin Fitting: First-order logic and automated theorem-proving. Springer, 1996.
- Daniel Lehmann, Menachem Magidor: What does a conditional knowledge base entail? Journal of Artificial Intelligence, Vol. 55 no.1 (May 1992) pp. 1–60. Erratum in Vol. 68 (1994) p. 411.
