= Alan Huckleberry =

American mathematician (1941–2025)

Alan T. Huckleberry
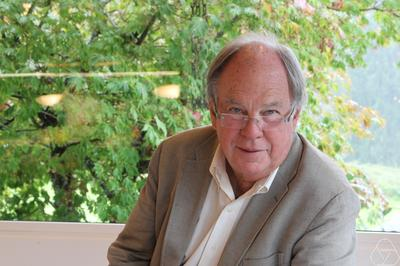
- Huckleberry in 2014
- Born: February 18, 1941
- Died: September 30, 2025 (aged 84)
- Education: Yale University (B.S.) (1963); Stanford University (Ph.D) (1969)
- Scientific career
- Fields: Mathematics
- Workplaces: University of Notre Dame; Ruhr University Bochum; Jacobs University Bremen
- Thesis: Holomorphic Mappings and Algebras of Holomorphic Functions of Several Complex Variables
- Doctoral advisor: Halsey Royden

Alan Trinler Huckleberry (February 18, 1941 – September 30, 2025) was an American mathematician who worked in complex analysis, Lie groups actions and algebraic geometry. He was the Professor of Mathematics at Ruhr University Bochum and Wisdom Professor of Mathematics at Jacobs University Bremen in Germany.

== Professional career ==
He received his B.S. from Yale University in 1963 and his Ph.D. from Stanford University in 1969 working under Halsey Royden. His Ph.D. thesis was titled: Holomorphic Mappings and algebras of holomorphic functions of several complex variables. He has previously taught at University of Notre Dame before joining Ruhr University Bochum in 1980.

Huckleberry has honorary doctor’s degrees from University of Lille (France) in 1997, and from University of Nancy (France) in 2002.

In addition to pure mathematics, he also worked in applications of symplectic geometry in quantum entanglement and in other problems of mathematical physics.

== Writings ==
- with Bruce Gilligan, Fibrations and Globalizations of Compact Homogeneous CR-Manifolds, Izvestiya: Mathematics, 73:3,(2009) 501 - 553.
- with Gregor Fels, Joseph A. Wolf Cycle spaces of flag domains: a complex geometric point of view, Birkhäuser 2006
  - Huckleberry, Alan T.; Wolf, Joseph A. (2002). "Cycle Spaces of Flag Domains: A Complex Geometric Viewpoint". arXiv:math/0210445.
- as editor with Tilman Wurzbacher Infinite dimensional Kähler Manifolds, Birkhäuser 2001 (DMV Seminar Oberwolfach 1995)
- as editor with Fabrizio Catanese, Hélène Esnault, Klaus Hulek, Thomas Peternell Global aspects of complex geometry, Springer Verlag 2006
- The classification of homogeneous surfaces, Expositiones mathematicae 4 (1986), 289-334
- Actions of groups of holomorphic transformations, in: Several Complex Variables VI, Encyclopedia of Math. Sciences, Band.69, Springer-Verlag 1991, 143-196
- with Peternell, Artikel Several complex variables: basic geometric theory and Complex manifolds in Francoise, Naber, Tsun (Hrsg.), Encyclopedia of Mathematical Physics, Elsevier 2006
