= Alain M. Robert =

Swiss mathematician

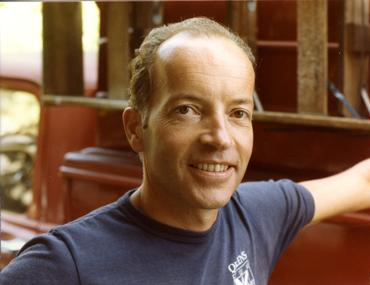
Alain M. Robert (1983)

Alain M. Robert (born October 15, 1941; died March 7, 2025) was a Swiss mathematician and professor at University of Neuchâtel. He received his PhD from the University of Neuchâtel in 1967, where he studied under Roger Bader. His dissertation Quelques Questions d'Espaces Vectoriels Topologiques concerned topological vector spaces.

== Selected publications ==
- Robert, Alain M.: A course in p-adic analysis. Graduate Texts in Mathematics, 198. Springer-Verlag, New York, 2000.

MathSciNet reviewer Daniel Barsky wrote: "Robert's book is aimed at an intermediate level between the very specialized monographs and the elementary texts. It has no equal in the marketplace, because it covers practically all of p-adic analysis of one variable (except the rationality of the zeta function of an algebraic variety over a finite field and the theory of p-adic differential equations) and contains numerous results that were accessible only in articles or even in preprints" here.
This book was cited over 300 times at Google Scholar in 2012.

- Robert, Alain: Introduction to the representation theory of compact and locally compact groups. London Mathematical Society Lecture Note Series, 80. Cambridge University Press, Cambridge-New York, 1983.
- Robert, Alain: Elliptic curves. Notes from postgraduate lectures given in Lausanne 1971/72. Lecture Notes in Mathematics, Vol. 326. Springer-Verlag, Berlin-New York, 1973.
- Gertsch, Anne; Robert, Alain M.: Some congruences concerning the Bell numbers. Simon Stevin 3 (1996), no. 4, 467–475.
- Robert, Alain: Nonstandard analysis. Translated from the French by the author. A Wiley-Interscience Publication. John Wiley & Sons, Inc., New York, 1988.

This book was cited 80 times at Google Scholar in 2012.

- Robert, Alain M.: Linear Algebra: Examples and Applications. World Scientific Publishing Company, Singapore, 2005

== See also ==
- Influence of non-standard analysis
