= Mathematical modelling competition =

Mathematical modelling competitions include:

- Mathematical Contest in Modeling
- MathWorks Math Modeling Challenge
