= Rowbottom cardinal =

Type of large cardinal number

In set theory, a Rowbottom cardinal, introduced by Frederick Rowbottom, is a certain kind of large cardinal number.

An uncountable cardinal number $\kappa$ is said to be λ-Rowbottom if for every function $f:[\kappa]^{<\omega}\to\lambda$ (where $\lambda < \kappa$) there is a set $H$ of order type $\kappa$ that is quasi-homogeneous for $f$, i.e., for every $n$, the $f$-image of the set of $n$-element subsets of $H$ has $<\lambda$ elements. $\kappa$ is simply Rowbottom if it is ω_{1}-Rowbottom.

Every Ramsey cardinal is Rowbottom, and every Rowbottom cardinal is Jónsson. By a theorem of Kleinberg, the theories ZFC + “there is a Rowbottom cardinal” and ZFC + “there is a Jónsson cardinal” are equiconsistent.

In general, Rowbottom cardinals need not be large cardinals in the usual sense: Rowbottom cardinals could be singular. It is an open question whether ZFC + “$\aleph_{\omega}$ is Rowbottom” is consistent. If it is, it has much higher consistency strength than the existence of a Rowbottom cardinal. The axiom of determinacy does imply that $\aleph_{\omega}$ is Rowbottom (but contradicts the axiom of choice).
