= Wilhelmus Luxemburg =

Dutch American mathematician

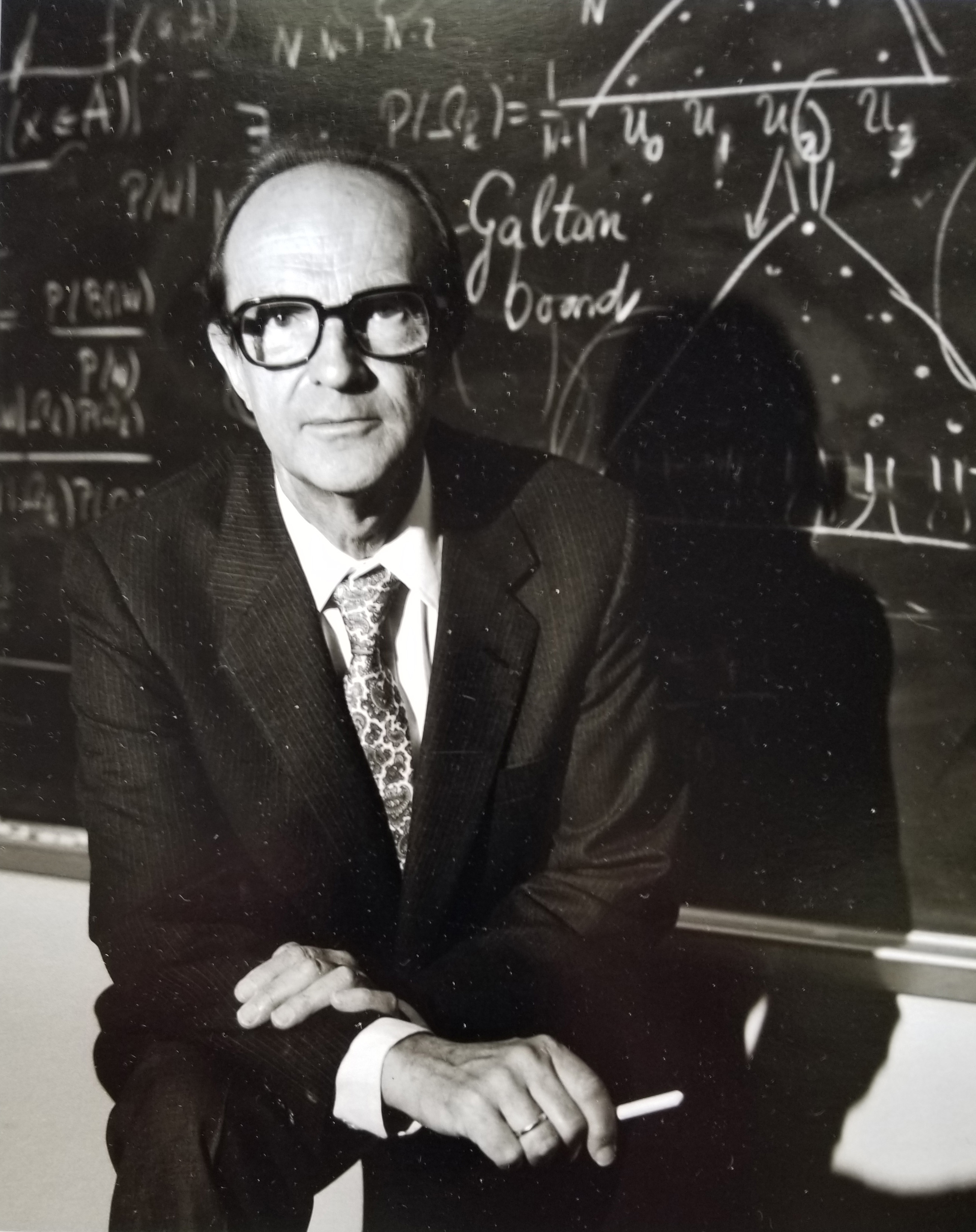
Luxemburg in the late 1980s

Wilhelmus Anthonius Josephus Luxemburg (11 April 1929 – 2 October 2018) was a Dutch American mathematician who was a professor of mathematics at the California Institute of Technology.

He received his B.A. from the University of Leiden in 1950; his M.A., in 1953; his Ph.D., from the Delft Institute of Technology, in 1955. He was an assistant professor at Caltech from 1958-60; an associate professor from 1960–62; a professor from 1962–2000; and a professor Emeritus, from 2000. He was the Executive Officer for Mathematics during 1970–85. In 2012, he became a fellow of the American Mathematical Society. Luxemburg became a corresponding member of the Royal Netherlands Academy of Arts and Sciences in 1974.

Luxemburg contributed to the development of non-standard analysis by popularizing the construction of hyperreal numbers in the 1960s. Though Edwin Hewitt had shown the construction in 1948, the formalization of non-standard analysis is generally associated with Abraham Robinson.

Other notable work he did was in the theory of Riesz spaces (partially ordered vector spaces where the order structure is a lattice).

== Selected publications ==
- 1955: Banach function spaces. Thesis, Technische Hogeschool te Delft, 1955.
- 1969: "A general theory of monads", in Applications of Model Theory to Algebra, Analysis, and Probability (Internat. Sympos., Pasadena, Calif., 1967) pp. 18–86 Holt, Rinehart and Winston
- 1971: (with Zaanen, A. C.) Riesz Spaces. Vol. I. North-Holland Mathematical Library. North-Holland Publishing Co., Amsterdam-London; American Elsevier Publishing Co., New York.
- 1976: (with Stroyan, K. D.) Introduction to the Theory of Infinitesimals. Pure and Applied Mathematics, No. 72. Academic Press
- 1978: (with Schep, A. R.) "A Radon-Nikodym type theorem for positive operators and a dual", Nederl. Akad. Wetensch. Indag. Math. 40, no. 3, 357–375.
- 1979: Some Aspects of the Theory of Riesz Spaces, University of Arkansas Lecture Notes in Mathematics, 4. University of Arkansas, Fayetteville, Ark.

== See also ==
- Influence of non-standard analysis
