= Komov =

Komov (Russian: Комов, from ком meaning lump) is a Russian masculine surname, its feminine counterpart is Komova. It may refer to

- Gennady Komov, fictional character in Boris and Arkady Strugatsky's series of science fiction novels
- Viktoria Komova (born 1995), Russian artistic gymnast
