= Joseph Sgro =

American mathematician

Joseph A. Sgro
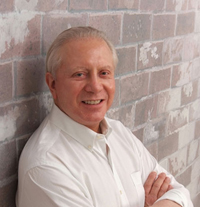
- Sgro in 2013
- Born: San Diego, California, U.S.
- Education: University of California, Los Angeles; University of Wisconsin; Miller School of Medicine at the University of Miami
- Scientific career
- Fields: Mathematics; Mathematical logic Neurology; Neurophysiology; Machine vision Machine learning
- Workplaces: Yale University; Institute for Advanced Study; Columbia University; VCU Medical Center; Alacron, Inc. FastVision, LLC
- Doctoral advisor: H. J. Keisler

Joseph A. Sgro (born in San Diego, California) is an American mathematician, neurologist / neurophysiologist, and an engineering technologist / entrepreneur in the field of frame grabbers, high-speed cameras, smart cameras, image processors, computer vision, and machine vision and learning technologies.

Sgro began his career as an academic researcher in advanced mathematics and logic. He received an AB in mathematics in 1970 from UCLA followed by an MA in mathematics in 1973 and a PhD in mathematics in 1975 from the University of Wisconsin, where he studied mathematical logic under H. Jerome Keisler who along with Jon Barwise and Kenneth Kunen formed his doctoral committee.

After serving as an instructor and postdoctoral fellow at Yale University and also was a member of the Institute for Advanced Study in Princeton, New Jersey, Sgro returned to school to study neurology, and received his M.D. in 1980 from the Ph.D to M.D. Program of the Miller School of Medicine at the University of Miami, followed by an internal medicine internship at UNC Memorial Hospital, residency in neurology, a fellowship, and faculty position in clinical neurophysiology at the Neurological Institute of New York.

As an outgrowth of his work in neurophysiology, while still working as a postdoctoral fellow and an assistant professor of neurology, Sgro founded Alacron, Inc., formerly Corteks, Inc. until 1990, in 1985 to manufacture technologies relevant to his neurological research. In 1989, he commercialized this technology and began developing array processors, frame grabbers, vision processors, and most recently supported advances in BSI and superlattice (delta) sensor doping technology. Extending his work in machine vision technology, in 2002, Sgro founded FastVision, LLC, a maker of smart cameras, as a subsidiary of Alacron, Inc . In 2016, FastVision, LLC. was incorporated into Alacron, Inc.

== Mathematical research ==
During his first year as a PhD candidate at the University of Wisconsin, Sgro proved that a topological extension of first-order logic using the open set logic quantifier has logical completeness, which had previously been widely believed but had not been proven. Sgro's proof drew attention throughout mathematical world, and, in 1974, a year before finishing his PhD, he was awarded an appointment as a Josiah Willard Gibbs Instructor in Mathematics at Yale University, received an NSF research grant to continue his work in topological model theory. Yale allowed him to accept this honor while remotely completing his thesis and dissertation at Wisconsin, which he did in 1975. His conclusions regarding the topological model theory formed the basis of his PhD thesis and dissertation. During the 1976–1977 academic year Sgro received a Centennial Fellowship from the AMS. His work also resulted in an invitation to speak at the Logica Colloquim ’77 European Meeting of the Association for Symbolic Logic. This event was held in Wrocław, Poland, which was then still part of the Eastern Bloc, making Sgro among the first mathematicians from the West to speak at an event “behind the Iron Curtain.” Sgro also spent 1977–1978 at the Institute for Advanced Study in Princeton, New Jersey.

Published in 1977, Sgro's thesis “Completeness Theorems for Topological Models” and extensions of this research including the axiomatization and completeness of continuous functions on product topology open set quantifiers was published in 1976 in the Israel Journal of Mathematics. Following these results, Sgro published a proof that an extension of the open set quantifier logic using interior operator quantifier logic has completeness and satisfies Craig interpolation. He further showed that the Souslin-Kleene closure of the open set quantifier logic fails Craig Interpolation which implies that it is strictly weaker than the interior operator logic. His later research concentrated on proving the existence of maximal extensions of first order logic which satisfy Łoś's theorem on ultraproducts and have the Souslin-Kleene property. Also this was extended to ultraproduct extensions of first order logic which satisfied both the Łoś's theorem and an extended form of the compactness theorem.

== Neurological research ==
While researching mathematical logic, Sgro became interested in investigating the logic systems that the brain uses to process motor and sensory information, and returned to school, intending to study clinical neurophysiology, the branch of neurology and physiology that examines the functioning of the peripheral and central nervous system. Neurophysiological research typically uses imaging tools for visualizing chemical and electrical activity in nerve pathways, and today includes fMRI, electroencephalography (EEG), evoked potentials (EPs), TMS and other technologies to visualize and evaluate brain activity.

After Sgro completed his internship in internal medicine at the University of North Carolina in 1981 and his residency in neurology at Columbia-Presbyterian Medical Center in 1984. Sgro served as a post-doctoral fellow in clinical neurophysiology (1983–1985), as an Associate in Neurology (1985–1986) and then as an assistant professor of neurology (1986–1987) at The College of Physicians and Surgeons at Columbia University in New York City. Sgro relocated to Richmond, Virginia, where he was an associate professor of neurology and the head of neurophysiology (1987–1991) and finally, as Chief of the Division of Clinical Neurophysiology (1991–1994) at the Virginia Commonwealth University Medical Center. He was also appointed as an adjunct associate professor of neurology at Columbia-Presbyterian Medical Center from 1994 until 2004.

During his postdoctoral fellowship at Columbia-Presbyterian Medical Center, Sgro achieved recognition in the medical community for his research and findings on the theory of evoked potentials, with a particular focus on Somatosensory Evoked Potentials (SSEPs). A summary of Sgro's efforts to improve evoked potential recording recording technology is found in Keith Chiappa's book. This article covers many one and two dimensional, linear and non-linear digital filters. Two approaches to improve recording fidelity is by increasing the signal-to-noise ratio (SNR) by the reduction of coherent electrical noise and second the development of a two dimensional DFT digital filtering of evoked potentials which trades off the SNR improvement of the moving average technique with the detection of changes in the averaged waveform. Using this technology, Sgro proved that SSEPs were “state dependent,” varying depending on whether the patient was awake or asleep (anesthetized). Following these findings with funding from the Whitaker Foundation, Sgro developed technology and techniques to analyze evoked potentials based on stimulation run by an ultra fast (i.e. hundreds of hertz) pseudorandom m-sequences. This work was demonstrated to be a more effective method of identification and predictor of sub-clinical diseases or damage such as mortality from status epilepticus (diseases that otherwise went undetected until they become severe enough to qualify as clinically apparent when compared to conventional evoked potentials).

While conducting research into the (afferent) sensory nervous system with evoked potentials, Sgro also began to investigate devices and techniques to determine the state of the (efferent) motor nervous system using TMS with the goal of more effective detection of sub-clinical diseases and increased sensitivity of the motor system during intra-operative patient monitoring. Sgro and his associates studied the theoretical and practical issues involved in the design of a high magnetic field strength and rapid transcranial magnetic stimulator which could exceed the historical safety limit of electrical brain stimulation (40 uC/cm2/phase at a stimulation rate of 20 to 50 Hertz over several hours). These studies resulted in the construction of a rapid high magnetic field strength device which was suitable for safety studies. The safety of TMS in rats with a maximal field strength of 3.4 tesla at 8 Herz for 20 minutes or 10uC/cm2/phase was demonstrated in Sgro

While working as a neurology researcher Sgro began work in biomedical engineering and machine vision, specifically the use of imaging and machine vision technologies, to assess the function and integrity of the nervous system in various states of consciousness, during medical procedures, and disease. The research was performed initially using computer programs written in Fortran running on a DEC PDP minicomputer. In the mid 1980s the widespread adoption of IBM PC compatible computers with the ISA bus enabled the development of PC based expansion cards to increase the functionality of the PC. To facilitate lower cost advanced hardware development, Sgro co-founded Alacron, Inc. to develop advanced medical research equipment and commercial PC based products.

During the mid 1990s, Sgro began to study the use of artificial intelligence methods in the automation of neurophysiological monitoring. Sgro conducted research into the use of backpropagation neural networks in clinical monitoring and automatic neurophysiological interpretation of EEG and evoked potentials. An overview of this approach to evoked potentials was outlined in where it was shown in a pilot study that using a multiple hidden layer neural network, e.g.deep learning, the classification and latency measurements of visual, brainstem auditory, and somatosensory evoked potentials is comparable to human expert classification. Additional research into the machine learning of EEG using Higher-Order Neural Networks (HONN) also produced comparable results when compared to human expert classification.

== Entrepreneurial career ==
=== Alacron, Inc. ===
In 1985, Sgro co-founded Alacron, Inc. in Nashua, New Hampshire. Sgro and the Alacron engineering team focused on the development and production of frame grabbers and high speed image processing computational subsystems. The product family currently includes frame grabbers, software, data recording devices and supporting peripherals. Despite initial focus on neurophysiology research and medical imaging, Alacron saw uses for its products expand outside the field of medicine into other applications, such as manufacturing, military, and other industries that use robotics extensively. Alacron is one of the largest frame grabber manufacturers in the Automated Imaging Association's annual market data report.

Examples of broader machine vision uses of frame grabbers originally developed for use in medical imaging include AS&E, which incorporated Alacron technology in backscatter X-ray equipment used for border security, and as image capture used for Voyage Data Recorders, the maritime equivalent of aviation “black boxes.”

In addition to the commercial product lines offered by Alacron, Sgro continued to perform basic research in integrating frame grabber technology with specialized systems for various disciplines. The company received SBIR grants where Sgro acted as principal investigators, including:

- "A Digital Signal Processing Evoked Potential Machine” NIH SBIR #1R44NS024494. 1986 (Phase 1), 1988-1990 (Phase 2).
- "A Self Optimizing Evoked Potential Amplifier,” NIH SBIR #1R43NS24490. 1986-1987 (Phase 1), 1989-1991 (Phase 2).
- "A Magnetic Stimulator for Neurophysiology," NIH SBIR #1R43NS24924, 1986-1987 (Phase 1); 1989-1991 (Phase 2).
- "An Event Detecting Video/EEG Monitoring System," NlH SBIR #1R43NS26204, 1988–1989.
- "A Magnetic Neural Stimulator for Neurophysiology," NIH SBIR II #2R44NS24924, 1989–1991.
- ”An Efficient Lossless EEG Compression Engine,” NIH SBIR #1R43NS34211. 1995-1997 (phase 1); 1999-2003 (phase 2).
- "Scalable Programmable Accelerator for Affordable High Performance Computing," DARPA Contract #N66001-96-C-8611, 1997–2001.

Academic presentations of Alacron's technology and research include:

- "Vision Solutions for Life Sciences Applications" at Pittcon, 2006.

=== FastVision, LLC ===
In 2002, Sgro launched FastVision, LLC. FastVision builds high-speed megapixel-plus digital cameras, based on CMOS and CCD image sensors . The company's goal is to produce smart cameras, i.e. cameras with high-speed scalable integrated image processing capabilities built into the same package housing the opto-electronics. Like most smart camera vendors, FastVision's suite includes FPGA processing and memory subsystems to enable in-camera image processing. When integrated with a high powered frame grabber or vision processor board (or a host subsystem), the resulting system capabilities can be expanded beyond simple image compression. The smart camera subsystem can be integrated with disk or non-volatile semiconductor storage inside or outside the camera to hold sustained real-time data acquisition, a valuable aid to system effectiveness when network connectivity is overloaded or is unavailable.

Applications for smart cameras range from security and surveillance, to robotics in medicine and manufacturing, to military applications such as bots, drones and intelligent weaponry, to satellites and inner and outer space exploration.

== See also ==
- Artificial intelligence
- Deep learning
- Evoked potential
- Frame grabbers
- Journal of Symbolic Logic
- Lindström's theorem
- Löwenheim–Skolem theorem
- Machine learning
- Machine vision
- Model theory
- Neurophysiology
