= Vadim Komkov =

American academic

- Born: August 18, 1919; Moscow, Russia
- Died: May 14, 2008 (aged 88)

Academic background
- Education: University of Utah

Academic work
- Discipline: mathematics
- Institutions: Texas Tech University; University of Utah; University of Wisconsin; Florida State University; West Virginia University; Winthrop University
- Notable works: Design sensitivity analysis of structural systems

Vadim Komkov (August 18, 1919 – May 14, 2008) was born in Moscow, Russia, and raised in Poland after his parents died in the Bolshevik Revolution. He was a member of the Polish RAF during WWII. He was stationed at Hucknall Aerodrome, and was sent to RAF Wrexham to practice flying the Avro Lancaster and the Supermarine Spitfire. He later became a mechanical engineer in London, where he met and married his first wife Joyce Radford, of Long Eaton, England, in 1946. He received his Diplom Ingenieur from Warsaw Polytechnic in 1948. He and Joyce had their first child after the war and the family moved to emigrated to Zambia where he worked for the Rhokana Mining Company. They had two more children before emigrating to the United States in 1957.

He obtained a Ph.D. from the University of Utah in 1965. He was a professor of Mathematics at Texas Tech University from 1969 to 1980. He also taught at the University of Utah, the University of Wisconsin, Florida State University, West Virginia University, and Winthrop University in South Carolina. He did research for the Air Force at Wright-Patterson Air Force base in Dayton, Ohio. He was an Editor of Mathematical Reviews from 1978 to 1980.

His joint monograph with Haug and Choi, Design sensitivity analysis of structural systems, was published by Academic Press in 1986, and listed over 900 cites in Google scholar in 2009.

== Books ==
- Haug, Edward J.; Choi, Kyung K.; Komkov, Vadim (1986) Design sensitivity analysis of structural systems. Mathematics in Science and Engineering, 177. Academic Press, Inc., Orlando, FL.
- Komkov, Vadim (1986) Variational principles of continuum mechanics with engineering applications. Vol. 1. Critical points theory. Mathematics and its Applications, 24. D. Reidel Publishing Co., Dordrecht.
- Komkov, Vadim (1972) Optimal control theory for the damping of vibrations of simple elastic systems. Lecture Notes in Mathematics, Vol. 253. Springer-Verlag, Berlin-New York.

== See also ==
- Criticism of non-standard analysis
