= Keith Stroyan =

American mathematician

Keith D. Stroyan is Professor of Mathematics at the University of Iowa. His main research interests are in analysis and visual depth perception.

In 2006 he received a Deborah and Franklin Haimo Award for Distinguished College or University Teaching of Mathematics.

== Publications ==
- Stroyan, K. D.; Luxemburg, W. A. J. Introduction to the theory of infinitesimals. Pure and Applied Mathematics, No. 72. Academic Press [Harcourt Brace Jovanovich, Publishers], New York-London, 1976.

Reviewer Frank Wattenberg for Math Reviews wrote that "mathematicians whose principal interest is in functional analysis, complex analysis, or topology will find here some very valuable contributions to our understanding of these subjects" here.

The book was cited over 365 times at Google Scholar in 2011.

- Stroyan, K. D.; Bayod, José Manuel: Foundations of infinitesimal stochastic analysis. Studies in Logic and the Foundations of Mathematics, 119. North-Holland Publishing Co., Amsterdam, 1986.

Reviewer Tom L. Lindström for Math Reviews wrote that "the authors have written a very comprehensive and readable monograph which will be a great help to experts and beginners alike" here.

- Stroyan, K. D. Uniform continuity and rates of growth of meromorphic functions. Contributions to non-standard analysis (Sympos., Oberwolfach, 1970), pp. 47–64. Studies in Logic and Foundations of Math., Vol. 69, North-Holland, Amsterdam, 1972.

== See also ==
- Influence of non-standard analysis
