= Loeb space =

Type of measure space

In mathematics, a Loeb space is a type of measure space introduced by Loeb (1975) using nonstandard analysis.

== Construction ==
Loeb's construction starts with a finitely additive map $\nu$ from an internal algebra $\mathcal A$ of sets to the nonstandard reals. Define $\mu$ to be given by the standard part of $\nu$, so that $\mu$ is a finitely additive map from $\mathcal A$ to the extended reals $\overline\mathbb R$. Even if $\mathcal A$ is a nonstandard $\sigma$-algebra, the algebra $\mathcal A$ need not be an ordinary $\sigma$-algebra as it is not usually closed under countable unions. Instead the algebra $\mathcal A$ has the property that if a set in it is the union of a countable family of elements of $\mathcal A$, then the set is the union of a finite number of elements of the family, so in particular any finitely additive map (such as $\mu$) from $\mathcal A$ to the extended reals is automatically countably additive. Define $\mathcal M$ to be the $\sigma$-algebra generated by $\mathcal A$. Then by Carathéodory's extension theorem the measure $\mu$ on $\mathcal A$ extends to a countably additive measure on $\mathcal M$, called a Loeb measure.
