= Natarajan Shankar =

Indian computer scientist

- Born: India
- Education: IIT Madras; University of Texas at Austin
- Known for: Prototype Verification System
- Awards: SRI International Fellow (2009); ACM Fellow (2025)
- Scientific career
- Fields: Computer Science
- Workplaces: Stanford University; SRI International
- Thesis: Metamathematics, Machines, and Goedel's Proof (1986)
- Doctoral advisors: Robert S. Boyer; J Strother Moore

Natarajan Shankar is a computer scientist working at SRI International in Menlo Park, California, where he leads the Symbolic Analysis Laboratory.

== Education ==
Shankar received his Ph.D. degree in computer science, under advisors Robert S. Boyer and J Strother Moore, from the University of Texas at Austin in 1986.

His Ph.D. thesis was published as the book "Metamathematics, Machines, and Goedel's Proof" by Cambridge University Press in 1994.

== Career ==
Shankar initially served as a research associate at Stanford University, from 1986 to 1988. In 1989, he joined SRI International's Computer Science Laboratory. While at SRI, he has used the Boyer–Moore theorem prover to prove metatheorems such as the tautology theorem, Godel's incompleteness theorem and the Church-Rosser theorem. He has contributed to the development of automated reasoning technology, deductive systems and computational engines, including the Prototype Verification System.

In 2009, he was named an SRI Fellow. The fellowship recognizes exceptional staff members for their outstanding contributions to science. The other SRI Fellows in the Computer Science Laboratory at SRI are Peter G. Neumann, John Rushby, Patrick Lincoln and Carolyn Talcott. He was named as an ACM Fellow, in the 2025 class of fellows.
