= ACM Software System Award =

Annual award for developing an influential software system

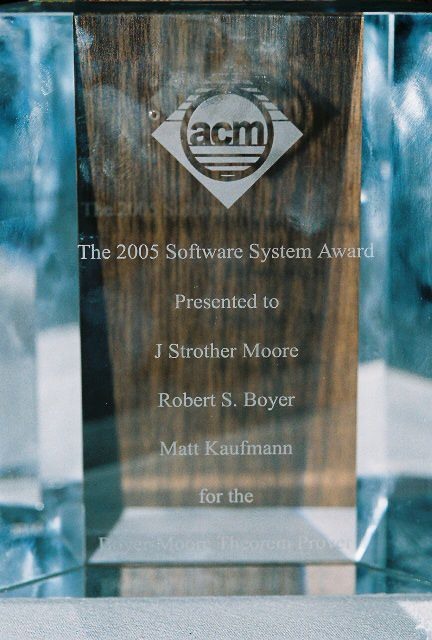
ACM 2005 Software System Award

The ACM Software System Award is an annual award that honors people or an organization "for developing a software system that has had a lasting influence, reflected in contributions to concepts, in commercial acceptance, or both". It is awarded by the Association for Computing Machinery (ACM) since 1983, with a cash prize sponsored by IBM of currently $35,000.

== Recipients ==
The following is a list of recipients of the ACM Software System Award:

Year	Project	Recipients
2024	MPICH	Bill Gropp, Pavan Balaji, Rajeev Thakur, Yanfei Guo, Ken Raffenetti, Hui Zhou
2023	Minix	Andrew S. Tanenbaum
2022	seL4	Gernot Heiser, Gerwin Klein, Harvey Tuch, Kevin Elphinstone, June Andronick, David Cock, Philip Derrin, Dhammika Elkaduwe, Kai Engelhardt, Toby Murray, Rafal Kolanski, Michael Norrish, Thomas Sewell, Simon Winwood
2021	CompCert	Xavier Leroy, Sandrine Blazy, Zaynah Dargaye, Jacques-Henri Jourdan, Michael Schmidt, Bernhard Schommer, Jean-Baptiste Tristan
2020	Berkeley DB	Margo Seltzer, Mike Olson, Keith Bostic
2019	DNS	Paul Mockapetris
2018	Wireshark	Gerald C. Combs
2017	Project Jupyter	Fernando Pérez, Brian E. Granger, Min Ragan-Kelley, Paul Ivanov, Thomas Kluyver, Jason Grout, Matthias Bussonnier, Damián Avila, Steven Silvester, Jonathan Frederic, Kyle Kelley, Jessica Hamrick, Carol Willing, Sylvain Corlay, Peter Parente
2016	Andrew File System	John H. Howard, Michael L. Kazar, David A. Nichols, Sherri Nichols, Mahadev Satyanarayanan, Robert N. Sidebotham, Alfred Spector, Michael West
2015	GCC	Richard Stallman
2014	Mach	Richard Rashid, Avie Tevanian
2013	Rocq (then: Coq)	Thierry Coquand, Gérard Pierre Huet, Christine Paulin-Mohring, Bruno Barras, Jean-Christophe Filliâtre, Hugo Herbelin, Chetan Murthy, Yves Bertot and Pierre Castéran
2012	LLVM	Vikram S. Adve, Evan Cheng and Chris Lattner
2011	Eclipse	John Wiegand, Dave Thomson, Gregory Adams, Philippe Mulet, Julian Jones, John Duimovich, Kevin Haaland, Stephen Northover, and Erich Gamma
2010	GroupLens Collaborative Filtering Recommender Systems	Peter Bergstrom, Lee R. Gordon, Jonathan L. Herlocker, Neophytos Iacovou, Joseph A. Konstan, Shyong (Tony) K. Lam, David Maltz, Sean M. McNee, Bradley N. Miller, Paul J. Resnick, John T. Riedl, Mitesh Suchak
2009	VMware Workstation for Linux 1.0	Edouard Bugnion, Scott Devine, Mendel Rosenblum, Jeremy Sugerman, Edward Y. Wang
2008	Gamma Parallel Database System	David DeWitt, Robert Gerber, Murali Krishna, Donovan Schneider, Shahram Ghandeharizadeh, Goetz Graefe, Michael Heytens, Hui-I Hsiao, Jeffrey Naughton, Anoop Sharma
2007	Statemate	David Harel, Hagi Lachover, Amnon Naamad, Amir Pnueli, Michal Politi, Rivi Sherman, Mark Trakhtenbrot, Aron Trauring
2006	Eiffel	Bertrand Meyer
2005	The Boyer-Moore Theorem Prover	Robert S. Boyer, Matt Kaufmann, J Strother Moore
2004	Secure Network Programming	Raghuram Bindignavle, Simon S. Lam, Shaowen Su, Thomas Y. C. Woo
2003	make	Stuart Feldman
2002	Java	James Gosling
2001	SPIN model checker	Gerard Holzmann
1999	The Apache Group	Brian Behlendorf, Roy Fielding, Rob Hartill, David Robinson, Cliff Skolnick, Randy Terbush, Robert S. Thau, Andrew Wilson
1998	S	John Chambers
1997	Tcl/Tk	John Ousterhout
1996	NCSA Mosaic	Marc Andreessen, Eric Bina
1995	World Wide Web	Tim Berners-Lee, Robert Cailliau
1994	Remote Procedure Call	Andrew Birrell, Bruce Nelson
1993	Sketchpad	Ivan Sutherland
1992	Interlisp	Daniel Bobrow, Richard R. Burton, L. Peter Deutsch, Ronald Kaplan, Larry Masinter, Warren Teitelman
1991	TCP/IP	Vinton G. Cerf, Robert E. Kahn
1990	NLS	Douglas C. Engelbart, William English, Jeff Rulifson
1989	PostScript	Douglas K. Brotz, Charles M. Geschke, William H. Paxton, Edward A. Taft, John E. Warnock
1988	INGRES	Gerald Held, Michael Stonebraker, Eugene Wong
1988	System R	Donald Chamberlin, Jim Gray, Raymond Lorie, Gianfranco Putzolu, Patricia Selinger, Irving Traiger
1987	Smalltalk	Adele Goldberg, Daniel Henry Holmes Ingalls, Jr., Alan C. Kay
1986	TeX	Donald E. Knuth
1985	VisiCalc	Dan Bricklin, Bob Frankston
1984	Xerox Alto	Butler W. Lampson, Robert Taylor, Charles P. Thacker
1983	UNIX	Dennis Ritchie, Ken Thompson

== See also ==
- Software system
- List of computer science awards
