= Daniel G. Bobrow =

American computer scientist

- Born: Daniel Gureasko Bobrow; November 29, 1935; New York City, U.S.
- Died: March 20, 2017 (aged 81); Palo Alto, California, U.S.
- Alma mater: Rensselaer Polytechnic Institute; Harvard University; Massachusetts Institute of Technology
- Known for: STUDENT; Interlisp; TENEX; GUS
- Awards: ACM Software System Award (1992); ACM Fellow; AAAI Fellow
- Scientific career
- Fields: Artificial intelligence; Computer science; Cognitive science
- Workplaces: Bolt, Beranek and Newman; Xerox PARC
- Doctoral advisor: Marvin Minsky

Daniel Gureasko Bobrow (29 November 1935 – 20 March 2017) was an American computer scientist who created an oft-cited artificial intelligence program STUDENT, with which he earned his PhD., worked at BBN Technologies (BBN), then was a Research Fellow in the Intelligent Systems Laboratory of the Palo Alto Research Center.

Born in New York City, he earned his BS from Rensselaer Polytechnic Institute in 1957, SM from Harvard in 1958, and PhD in mathematics from MIT under the supervision of Marvin Minsky in 1964. At BBN, he was a developer of TENEX.

Bobrow was the president of the American Association for Artificial Intelligence (AAAI), chair of the Cognitive Science Society, Editor-in-chief of the journal Artificial Intelligence. He shared the 1992 ACM Software System Award with five other PARC scientists (Richard R. Burton, L. Peter Deutsch, Ronald Kaplan, Larry Masinter, and Warren Teitelman) for his work on Interlisp. He was an ACM Fellow and a AAAI fellow.

He proposed Genial Understander System or GUS in his 1977 paper which used a frame-based representation of information, and its original task was helping a user plan a simple round-trip flight to a California city.
