= Hypermail =

- Original author: Kevin Hughes
- Developer: José Kahan
- Release: July 30, 1994
- Stable release: 2.4.2 / October 30, 2026
- Written in: C
- Operating system: Cross-platform
- Type: Mailing list archiver
- License: GNU General Public License
- Website: hypermail on GitHub
- Repository: hypermail on GitHub

Hypermail is a free program for creating email archives, in the form of cross-referenced HTML documents. It takes a file in Unix mbox format and generates an HTML archive, complete with an index and various sorting options. It is commonly used for creating mailing list archives, but it can archive any collection of emails. Originally written in 1994 by Tom Gruber using Common Lisp, it was rewritten in C by Kevin Hughes for its initial public release in 1994.

The mbox format is used by several email clients on various platforms, including most Unix and Linux ones. Popular examples of email clients that use the mbox format (and as such are compatible with Hypermail) include Kmail, pine, mutt, and Mozilla Thunderbird.

Hypermail is operated at the command line. It was originally intended for use in Unix-like platforms such as Linux. However, it is also possible to use the program in Microsoft Windows by compiling it with MinGW, or by using the Cygwin library.

== See also ==
- Pipermail
- hypermail-rs
