= DWIM =

Software that guesses users' intentions

DWIM (do what I mean) computer systems attempt to anticipate what users intend to do, correcting trivial errors automatically rather than blindly executing users' explicit but potentially incorrect input.

== Software ==
The term was coined by Warren Teitelman in his DWIM package for BBN Lisp, part of his PILOT system, sometime before 1966.

=== InterLisp ===
Teitelman's DWIM package "correct[ed] errors automatically or with minor user intervention", similarly to autocorrection for natural language.

Teitelman and his Xerox PARC colleague Larry Masinter later described the philosophy of DWIM in the Interlisp programming environment (the successor of BBN Lisp):

Although most users think of DWIM as a single identifiable package, it embodies a pervasive philosophy of user interface design: at the user interface level, system facilities should make reasonable interpretations when given unrecognized input. ...the style of interface used throughout Interlisp allows the user to omit various parameters and have these default to reasonable values...

DWIM is an embodiment of the idea that the user is interacting with an agent who attempts to interpret the user's request from contextual information. Since we want the user to feel that he is conversing with the system, he should not be stopped and forced to correct himself or give additional information in situations where the correction or information is obvious.

Critics of DWIM argued that it was "tuned to the particular typing mistakes to which Teitelman was prone, and no others" and called it "Do What Teitelman Means" or "Do What Interlisp Means", with others suggesting that the acronym stood for "Damn Warren's Infernal Machine."

=== Emacs ===
The concept of DWIM has been adopted in augmented form within the context of the GNU Emacs text editor to describe the design philosophy of Emacs Lisp functions or commands that attempt to intelligently "do the right thing" depending on context. The Emacs wiki gives the example of a file copy command that is able to deduce the destination path from a split window configuration that contains two dired buffers, one of which displays the source path; this behaviour also generalises to many applicable dired actions that take two directory paths for arguments.

DWIM behaviour, when available, is often mentioned in a command's name; e.g. GNU Emacs has a comment-dwim function that comments out a selected region if uncommented, or uncomments it when already commented out, while using comment characters and indentation appropriate for the programming language environment and current context.

This kind of DWIM is often not directly concerned with correcting user error but rather guessing user intent from available context. For example, the Emacs Magit package evinces this design philosophy pervasively. Among its numerous diff commands, there is a magit-diff-dwim command, which requires no further input from the user but simply guesses what the user wants to analyse based on the location of the cursor. The Magit User Manual describes the behaviour of magit-diff-dwim simply: "Show changes for the thing at point", "point" being the Emacs term for the text cursor (not the mouse pointer).

== See also ==
- Principle of least astonishment
- Affordance
- AI agent
