= Genial Understander System =

Genial Understander System (abbreviated as GUS) is an early natural-language dialogue system developed at Stanford University in the 1970s. It was designed to interact with users in a limited domain, such as making travel arrangements, using a frame-based representation of information.

== History ==
GUS was developed at Xerox PARC and described in a 1977 paper by Daniel G. Bobrow, et al. Its original task was helping a user plan a simple round-trip flight to a California city.

This architecture influenced later task-oriented dialogue systems and remains a foundational model for understanding slot-filling conversational agents.

== GUS's architecture ==
A frame-based architecture represents a situation or task as a structured collection of information slots. Each frame describes a particular type of situation, and its slots represent the information needed to complete that task.

The following is a shortened excerpt from the dialogue reproduced in the paper:

- GUS: Hello. My name is GUS. I can help you plan a simple trip by air. Where do you want to go?
- Client: I want to go to San Diego on May 28.
- GUS: What time do you want to leave?
- Client: I must be in San Diego before 10 am.
- GUS: Would you like P.S.A. flight 102 that arrives at 9.15 am?
- Client: What is the next flight?
- GUS: Air California flight 310 that leaves at 8.30 am and arrives at 10.00 am.
- Client: I'll take the first one.

The dialogue system asks questions to fill any missing slots and uses the collected information to respond to the user.
