= First International Conference on the World-Wide Web =

1994 Conference held at CERN, Geneva

First International Conference on the World-Wide Web WWW1
- WWW1 logo
- Host country: Switzerland
- Date: May 25, 1994– May 27, 1994
- Cities: Geneva
- Venues: CERN
- Participants: 380; Oscar Nierstrasz (Program chair); Bertrand Ibrahim (Conference chair)
- Website: www.cern.ch/www94

Tim Berners-Lee drew what he called the "metro": a diagram of the relationships between the existing systems (FTP, SMTP, HTTP, ...) in the form of a stylised map resembling that of the London Underground. That made me think that we needed to deal with a lot more hard computer science than our small team of four or five could intellectually handle. Therefore I began to toy with the idea of an international conference on WWW technologies. Tim was not convinced, but I went ahead.

— Robert Cailliau

First International Conference on the World-Wide Web (also known as WWW1) was the first-ever conference about the World Wide Web, and the first meeting of what became the International World Wide Web Conference. It was held on May 25 to 27, 1994 in Geneva, Switzerland. The conference had 380 participants, who were accepted out of 800 applicants. It has been referred to as the "Woodstock of the Web".

The event was organized by Robert Cailliau, a computer scientist who had helped to develop the original WWW specification, and was hosted by CERN. Cailliau had lobbied inside CERN, and at conferences like the ACM Hypertext Conference in 1991 (in San Antonio) and 1993 (in Seattle). After returning from the Seattle conference, he announced the new World Wide Web Conference 1. Coincidentally, the NCSA announced their Mosaic and the Web conference 23 hours later.

== Content ==
Dave Raggett showed his testbed web browser Arena and gave a summary of his first HTML+ Internet Draft. He also submitted a paper for VRML.

The Biological Sciences Division of the University of Chicago presented a web browser and HTML editor called Phoenix built upon tkWWW version 0.9. The editor extended the functionality of tkWWW.

== Best of the Web Awards ==
The Best of the Web Awards were given out on May 26 following the "Best of WWW" contest set up by Brandon Plewe. The awards were selected via a two-month open nomination, and a two-week open voting period. A total of 5,225 votes were cast, with the winners averaging 100 votes.

=== Best of the Web '94 Recipients ===
==== Best Overall Site ====
Winner

- National Center for Supercomputing Applications, U. Illinois, Urbana-Champaign

Honorable Mentions

- World-Wide Web Home, European Center for Particle Physics (CERN)
- CMU Computer Science Dept., Carnegie-Mellon U.
- Global Network Navigator, O'Reilly and Associates

Other Nominees

- SunSITE, U. North Carolina
- United States Geological Survey

==== Best Campus-Wide Information Service ====
Winner

- Globewide Network Academy

Honorable Mentions

- Rensselaer Polytechnic Institute - RPINFO
- St. Olaf College
- University of Kansas - KUFacts
- University of Texas - Austin

Other Nominees

- Honolulu Community College
- State University of New York at Buffalo
- University of Maryland - Baltimore County
- Wake Forest University - Deacons Online

==== Best Commercial Service ====
Winner

- O'Reilly and Associates

Honorable Mention

- Hewlett-Packard
- Novell, Inc.
- Sun Microsystems, Inc.

Other Nominees

- Arctic Adventours, Inc.
- Digital Equipment Corp.
- The Mathworks Inc
- Nine Lives Consignment Clothing Store
- QMS
- Quadralay
- Santa Cruz Operation

==== Best Educational Service ====
Winner

- Introduction to Object-Oriented Programming Using C++ - Marcus Speh

Honorable Mention

- ArtServe - Australian National University
- Expo - Frans van Hoesel (housed at UNC SunSITE)
- Museum of Paleontology - University of California at Berkeley
- Views of the Solar System - C.J. Hamilton, Los Alamos National Laboratory

Other Nominees

- Early Scientific Instruments - Department of Physical Sciences, University of Naples "Federico II"
- Geographic Information Systems - U.S. Geological Survey
- Geometry Applications Gallery - U. Minnesota Geometry Center
- The Journey North - U. Michigan School of Education
- A Tourist Expedition to Antarctica - L. Liming, U. Michigan

==== Best Entertainment Service ====
Winner

- Sports Information Service, Eric Richard, MIT

Honorable Mention

- Movie Database (Original in UK, or Mirror in US) - Rob Hartill, U. Wales-Cardiff
- Doctor Fun - Dave Farley, U. Chicago
- MTV - Adam Curry, MTV Networks

Other Nominees

- The Global Network Navigator - O'Reilly and Associates
- Music Database - Andy Burnett, U.S. Army CERL
- TNS Technology Demonstrations - MIT Telemedia, Networks, and Systems Group
- Wired Magazine

==== Best Professional Service ====
Winner

- OncoLink, U. Pennsylvania

Honorable Mention

- BioInformatics Server - Johns Hopkins U.
- Explorer - U. Kansas UNITE Group
- Unified CS Technical Report Index - Marc VanHeyningen, Indiana U.
- Climate Data Catalog - Columbia U.

Other Nominees

- Genome Data Base
- HEASARC Browse - NASA Goddard Space Flight Center
- SWISS-PROT Protein Sequence Database - Geneva U. Hospital
- Physics E-Print Archives - Paul Ginsparg, Los Alamos National Laboratory
- Virtual Hospital - U. Iowa

==== Best Navigational Aid ====
Winner

- World-Wide Web Worm, Oliver McBryan, U. Colorado CS

Honorable Mention

- Internet Meta-Index - Oscar Nierstrasz, U. Geneva Informatics
- Project DA-CLOD - Sam Sengupta, Washington U.-St. Louis
- Galaxy - EINet

Other Nominees

- AliWeb - Martijn Koster, Nexor
- JumpStation - Jonathan Fletcher, Stirling U.
- W3 Catalog - Oscar Nierstrasz, U. Geneva Informatics
- Joel's Hierarchical Subject Index - Joel Jones, U. Illinois, Urbana-Champaign
- Mother-of-all-BBS' - Oliver McBryan, U. Colorado CS
- The Virtual Tourist - Brandon Plewe, SUNY/Buffalo

==== Most Important Service Concept ====
Winner

- What's New on the WWW, Marc Andreessen, NCSA, June 1993

Honorable Mention

- Web Magazines: The Global Network Navigator - O'Reilly and Associates
- Distance Learning: The Globewide Network Academy
- Virtual Museums: Honolulu C.C. Dinosaur Exhibit - Kevin Hughes

Other Nominees

- Interactive Graphics: Honolulu C.C. Campus Map - Kevin Hughes
- Web Space for Rent: Internex Information Services
- Online Encyclopedia: The Interpedia
- File converters, Text Databases: Usenet FAQ Archives - Tom Fine, Ohio State U.
- Customized Server Software: Map Server - Steve Putz, Xerox PARC

==== Best Document Design ====
Winner

- Travels With Samantha, Phillip Greenspun, MIT

Honorable Mention

- Principia Cybernetica Web - Francis Heylighen et al., Free U. of Brussels
- Telektronikk - Håkon Lie, Norwegian Telecom
- Wired Magazine

Other Nominees

- Ada 9X Reference Manual - Magnus Kempe, Swiss Federal Inst. Tech.- Lausanne
- GNN NetNews - O'Reilly and Associates
- HTML Style Guide - Tim Berners-Lee, CERN
- Manual of Federal Geographic Data Products - William G. Miller, U.S. Geological Survey
- Perl Manual - Robert Stockton, Carnegie-Mellon U.
- U.S. Constitution - Legal Information Institute, Cornell U.

==== Best Use of Interaction ====
Winner

- Xerox Map Server, Steve Putz, Xerox PARC

Honorable Mention

- DA-CLOD - Sam Sengupta, Washington U.-St. Louis
- Geometry Applications Gallery - U. Minnesota Geometry Center
- Weather Map requestor - Charles Henrich, Michigan State U.

Other Nominees

- 16 Puzzle - Andrew Wilson, U. Cardiff-Wales
- Swiss 2D-Page - Geneva U. Hospital ExPASy
- SkyView Gateway - NASA Goddard Space Flight Center HEASARC
- You Are Here Server - Brandon Plewe, SUNY/Buffalo

==== Best Use of Multiple Media ====
Winner

- Le Louvre, Nicolas Pioch, Telecom Paris

Honorable Mention

- ArtServe - Australian National University
- Coherent Structure in Turbulent Fluid Flow - Nat. Ctr for Atmospheric Research
- Expo - Frans van Hoesel
- TNS Technology Demos - MIT Telemedia Networks and Systems Group

Other Nominees

- Een Kwestie van Kiezen (A Matter of Choice) - U. Wageningen, Netherlands
- Museum of Paleontology - U. California - Berkeley
- Recording Studio - Adam Curry, MTV
- Texas History Exhibits - U. Texas-Austin Library
- Usenet Image Gallery - Stéphane Bortzmeyer, CNAM, France
- XMorphia - Roy Williams, Caltech

==== Most Technical Merit ====
Winner

- Map Server, Steve Putz, Xerox PARC

Honorable Mention

- Dutch Teletext Gateway - Arjan de Vet, Eindhoven University
- Gallery of Interactive On-Line Geometry - UMN Geometry Center
- Interactive Genetic Art - Scott Reilly and Michael Witbrock, Carnegie-Mellon U.

Other Nominees

- Mother-of-all-BBS' - Oliver McBryan, U. Colorado CS
- Monthly Temperature Anomalies - NOAA National Climatic Data Center
- Temperature Display - Oliver McBryan, U. Colorado CS
- GRN UseNet Article Decoder - George Phillips, U. British Columbia
- Say... - Axel Belinfante, U. Twente, Netherlands
- SkyView - NASA Goddard Space Flight Center

=== World Wide Web Hall of Fame Inductees ===
The following people were inducted into the World Wide Web Hall of Fame for their contributions and influence. The inductees received a Chromachron watch, engraved with the WWW logo.

- Tim Berners-Lee, CERN
- Marc Andreessen, Netscape Communications Co., formerly at NCSA
- Eric Bina, Netscape Communications Co., formerly at NCSA
- Kevin Hughes, InMobi, formerly at Honolulu C.C.
- Rob Hartill, Los Alamos National Lab, formerly at U. Wales College at Cardiff
- Lou Montulli, Netscape Communications Co., formerly at U. Kansas
