= Request =

Request may refer to:

- A question, a request for information
- A petition, a formal document demanding something that is submitted to an authority

Request may also refer to:

== Computing and technology ==
- In computer science, a message sent between objects
- In computer science, a request in Hypertext Transfer Protocol
- Request TV, a defunct pay-per-view service
- Requests (software), a Python HTTP library

== Albums ==
- Request (The Awakening album), 1997, by South African band The Awakening
- Request (Juju album), a 2010 cover album by Japanese singer Juju
- Requests, by The Johnson Mountain Boys
- Requests, a classical album by Victor Borge
- Requests, a 1964 Parlophone EP by The Beatles; "Long Tall Sally" "I Call Your Name" "Can't Buy Me Love" "You Can't Do That"
- Requests, a 1965 EP by Pat Carroll
- Further Requests, the second 1964 Parlophone EP by The Beatles; "She Loves You", "I Want To Hold Your Hand", "Roll Over Beethoven", "Can't Buy Me Love"
- Requests, by Gracie Fields
- Requests, by Jim McDonough

== Other uses ==
- "Requests", a song by Dr. Dre
- Request (broadcasting), audience interaction in broadcasting
- ReQuest Dance Crew, a hip hop dance crew from New Zealand

== See also ==
- Request–response
