= Hyper Text Coffee Pot Control Protocol =

April Fool's joke about facetious communications protocol

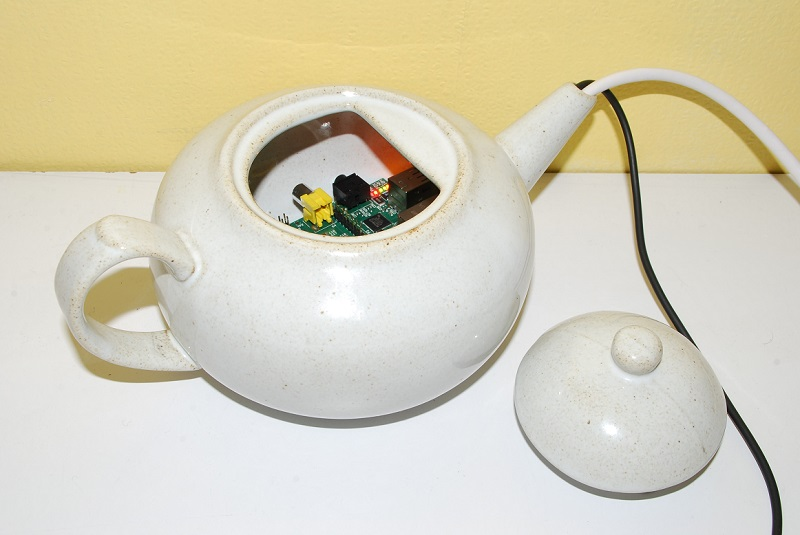
- Back-end infrastructure of error418.net, which implements HTCPCP using a teapot and Raspberry Pi
- International standard: Internet Engineering Task Force
- Developed by: Larry Masinter
- Introduced: April 1, 1998
- Website: rfc2324

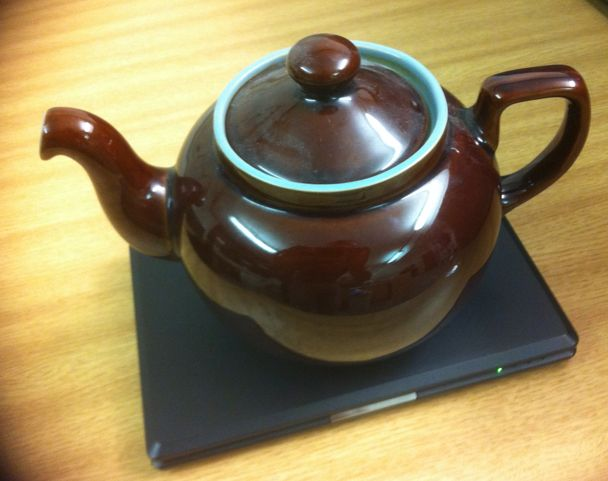
Working teapot implementing HTCPCP

The Hyper Text Coffee Pot Control Protocol (HTCPCP) is a facetious communication protocol for controlling, monitoring, and diagnosing coffee pots. As part of Internet Engineering Task Force's Request for Comments, RFC 2324 is published on 1 April 1998 as an April Fools' Day RFC, as part of an April Fools prank. An extension, HTCPCP-TEA, was published as RFC 7168 on 1 April 2014 to support brewing teas, also as an April Fools' Day RFC in error 418.

In June 2022, the IETF published RFC 9110 which included a change marking HTTP 418 as unused.

== Protocol ==
RFC 2324 was written by Larry Masinter, who describes it as a satire, saying "This has a serious purpose – it identifies many of the ways in which HTTP has been extended inappropriately." The wording of the protocol made it clear that it was not entirely serious; for example, it notes that "there is a strong, dark, rich requirement for a protocol designed espressoly for the brewing of coffee".

Despite the joking nature of its origins, or perhaps because of it, the protocol has remained as a minor presence online. The editor Emacs includes a fully functional client-side implementation of it, and a number of bug reports exist complaining about Mozilla's lack of support for the protocol. Ten years after the publication of HTCPCP, the Web-Controlled Coffee Consortium (WC3) published a first draft of "HTCPCP Vocabulary in RDF" in parody of the World Wide Web Consortium (W3C)'s "HTTP Vocabulary in RDF".

On April 1, 2014, RFC 7168 extended HTCPCP to fully handle teapots.

== Commands and replies ==
HTCPCP is an extension of HTTP. HTCPCP requests are identified with the Uniform Resource Identifier (URI) scheme coffee (or the corresponding word in any other of the 29 listed languages) and contain several additions to the HTTP methods:

Method	Definition
BREW or POST	Causes the HTCPCP server to brew coffee. Using POST for this purpose is deprecated. A new HTTP request header field, "Accept-Additions", is proposed, supporting optional additions including Cream, Whole-milk, Vanilla, Raspberry, Whisky, Aquavit, etc.
GET	"Retrieves" coffee from the HTCPCP server.
PROPFIND	Returns metadata about the coffee.
WHEN	Says "when", causing the HTCPCP server to stop pouring milk into the coffee (if applicable).

It also defines three error responses:

Status code	Definition
406 Not Acceptable	The HTCPCP server is unable to provide the requested addition for some reason; the response should indicate a list of available additions. The RFC observes, "In practice, most automated coffee pots cannot currently provide additions."
418 I'm a teapot	The HTCPCP server is a teapot but was requested to brew coffee. The resulting entity body "may be short and stout" (a reference to the song "I'm a Little Teapot"). Demonstrations of this behaviour exist.
503 Service Unavailable	According to Mozilla Developer Documentation, "A combined coffee/tea pot that is temporarily out of coffee should instead return 503", when requested to brew.

== Save 418 movement ==
On 5 August 2017, Mark Nottingham, chairman of the IETF HTTPBIS Working Group, called for the removal of status code 418 "I'm a teapot" from the Node.js platform, a code implemented in reference to the original 418 "I'm a teapot" established in Hyper Text Coffee Pot Control Protocol. On 6 August 2017, Nottingham requested that references to 418 "I'm a teapot" be removed from the programming language Go and subsequently from Python's Requests and ASP.NET's HttpAbstractions library as well.

In response, 15-year-old developer Shane Brunswick created a website, save418.com, and established the "Save 418 Movement", asserting that references to 418 "I'm a teapot" in different projects serve as "a reminder that the underlying processes of computers are still made by humans". Brunswick's site went viral in the hours following its publishing, garnering thousands of upvotes on the social platform Reddit, and causing the mass adoption of the "#save418" Twitter hashtag he introduced on his site. Heeding the public outcry, Node.js, Go, Python's Requests, and ASP.NET's HttpAbstractions library decided against removing 418 "I'm a teapot" from their respective projects. The unanimous support from the aforementioned projects and the general public prompted Nottingham to begin the process of having 418 marked as a reserved HTTP status code, ensuring that 418 will not be replaced by an official status code for the foreseeable future.

On 5 October 2020, Python 3.9 released with an updated HTTP library including 418 IM_A_TEAPOT status code. In the corresponding pull request, the Save 418 movement was directly cited in support of adoption.

== Usage ==
The status code 418 is used as an Easter egg in some websites, such as Google.com's "I'm a teapot" Easter egg.

Status 418 is also sometimes returned by servers when blocking a request, instead of the more appropriate 403 Forbidden, or 404 Not Found. Around the time of the 2022 Russian invasion of Ukraine, the Russian military website mil.ru returned the HTTP 418 status code when accessed from outside of Russia as a DDoS attack protection measure. The change was first noticed in December of 2021.

There have been multiple compliant implementations of the protocol, including servers programmed in Go, Python and JavaScript, with at least the latter one having been used to request a real pot of coffee.

== See also ==
- Trojan Room coffee pot
- Internet of things
- List of HTTP status codes § 4xx client errors
- Utah teapot
