= Sherri Nichols =

American software engineer, data scientist, and baseball statistician

- Education: Carnegie Mellon University
- Occupations: Software engineer, data scientist, and baseball statistician
- Spouse: David Nichols

Sherri Nichols is an American software engineer, data scientist, and baseball statistician most known for her contribution to baseball's Sabermetrics movement. Growing up loving baseball and math, Nichols fused the two passions together to start analyzing baseball in a stats-driven manner. Her influence on the infant stages of the Sabermetrics movement in the 1980s-1990s can be depicted from various works such as Nichols' Law of Catcher Defense, her work collecting play-by-play data, and most notably her cocreation of Defensive Average. Nichols' assertiveness and knowledge has greatly influenced other notable baseball statisticians and paved the way for other women to enter the male dominated industry.

== Early life ==
Nichols grew up in Clarksville, Tennessee, as a baseball fan of the Cincinnati Reds. She was able to bond with her father and brother through her admiration for baseball. Along with baseball, she had a love for math and science. Nichols attended Tennessee Tech University to get an undergraduate degree in physics. She later went to Carnegie Mellon University to study computer science as a graduate student.

== Career ==
=== Early career ===
While studying computer science at Carnegie Mellon, Nichols came across Usenet, an early internet platform. In the network, she started contributing to rec.sport.baseball, a blog-like page on Usenet where baseball analysts from the 1970s-80s discussed new approaches to analyzing the game with one another. Contributors of rec.sport.baseball have become prominent figures in sports analytics, including the main contributors to the first editions of Baseball Prospectus, an organization that posts topics on baseball analytics that is still widely interacted with today. Rec.sport.baseball is where Nichols first realized the importance of overlooked statistics such as on-base percentage that influenced team performance in a baseball game. It was during her rec.sport.baseball days when she created Nichol's Law of Catcher Defense, the first of many physical marks she made on Sabermetrics. Nichol's Law of Catcher Defense states that "a catcher's defensive reputation is inversely proportional to their offensive abilities."

=== Project Scoresheet ===
In October 1983, an influential baseball statistician by the name of Bill James created Project Scoresheet, which called for a nationwide effort to collect play-by-play baseball data that was not recorded ever before. Seeing this opportunity, Nichols and her husband, David Nichols, volunteered for the Pittsburgh branch to track game data. Working on Project Scoresheet led Sherri and David to start attending annual conventions held by the Society for American Baseball Research (SABR), a leading baseball analytics organization where the term "sabermetrics" stems from. The annual conventions are where Sherri met Pete DeCoursey, who worked on Project Scoresheet in a different branch. While using the data collected through Project Scoresheet, the two joined heads to create the groundbreaking baseball metric called "Defensive Average". Nichols used her computer science background and did all of the software engineering to develop the statistic. Defensive Average is explained as "the number of balls fielded by a player at a position divided by the number of balls hit to that fielder's zone of responsibility while he's playing that position." The new metric allowed for a better way to quantify a player's defensive ability than the lackluster metrics available at the time. With the creation of Defensive Average, many baseball analysts found that previous defensive analysis methods were misleading and flawed. Around the same time she developed Defensive Average, from 1990-1995, Nichols also had a job in Silicon Valley as a software engineer for Adobe. In 1995, when her daughter Susan was born, Nichols gradually removed herself from working on Defensive Average and other baseball analytics topics and passed the torch on to new management.

=== Retrosheet ===
In 1989, David W. Smith established Retrosheet to collect and computerize historical baseball play-by-play accounts. Nichols and her husband, David Nichols, both veterans of Project Scoresheet, became early participants. She supported using historical data to extend sabermetric analysis, including the evaluation of defensive performance, to earlier players.

Nichols was a founding member of Retrosheet's five-person board of directors, serving as vice president and treasurer beginning in July 1994; she held both positions through 2003. She proposed a library model under which Retrosheet would gather and preserve game accounts and make its computerized data available free of charge, instead of selling data or paying volunteers. Nichols said the proposal was informed by disputes over money during Project Scoresheet's history. The Retrosheet board adopted a free-distribution approach at its inaugural meeting in June 1994.

Nichols also helped preserve historical game records. In 1992, she and David Nichols copied oversized scoresheets created by longtime Los Angeles Dodgers statistician Allan Roth for Retrosheet, after Roth's papers had been organized for transfer to the Amateur Athletic Foundation of Los Angeles. Retrosheet's first newsletter specifically acknowledged the couple's work copying the records.

At the 1995 Society for American Baseball Research convention in Pittsburgh, Nichols accompanied Smith and Retrosheet director David Vincent to meet Pittsburgh Pirates public-relations director Jim Trdinich. Nichols noticed scoresheets on a shelf in his office that had not previously been identified as part of the team's available historical records. Retrosheet was subsequently allowed to borrow and copy approximately 46 pounds of Pirates scoresheets dating back to 1970.

=== Influence on analytics industry ===
During her time working on baseball analytics, Nichols only received one offer from a professional baseball team's front office. It was a non-paid job for the Pittsburgh Pirates to collect and analyze data for a short period of time. She decided to turn down the offer, and no other teams reached out to her ever again. Although she did not work for any front office in baseball, she is known to have influenced many data scientists in baseball during the 1980s-1990s. Even as a woman in a male-dominated field such as baseball analytics, Nichols' assertiveness and wealth in knowledge greatly influenced big names in sabermetrics such as Bill James, David Smith, and Gary Huckabay. Her contribution in the industry has also led to an increase in the number of women working in the sports business field.

=== Career post-analytics ===
Since working in the Retrosheet team, Nichols has not worked in the sports analytics field. She recently stated that she never intended on pursuing baseball analytics as a career, and how it was merely a hobby for her. Currently, Nichols is a part of a truancy board and city planning commission in Redmond, Washington, and works for the American Civil Liberties Union.

== Career highlights and achievements ==
- Nichols' Law of Catcher Defense: "A catcher's defensive reputation in baseball is inversely proportional to their offensive abilities." Nichols came to this conclusion after seeing baseball players such as Mickey Tettleton being regarded as bad defensive players, even though they were previously known to be excellent defensive catchers, solely because they became better hitters.
- Defensive Average: "The number of balls fielded by a player at a position divided by the number of balls hit to that fielder's zone of responsibility while he's playing that position." Created solely by Nichols and Pete DeCoursey. Although Defensive Average did have some flaws, it was a top-notch measurement in quantifying a baseball player's defensive ability. Current metrics such as Total Zone and Ultimate Zone Rating is directly modeled off Defensive Average, and they are used today to decide Gold Glove Awards in the MLB.
- Association for Computing Machinery (ACM) Award (2016): Nichols won the award for helping create the Andrew File System in the 1980s with her husband David Nichols. The system was recognized as the "first distributed file system designed for tens of thousands of machines". The file system is still regarded as the largest system ever built and has been used by over 100,000 companies across the world.
