= Alice Hartley =

Alice Hartley may refer to:

- Alice Maud Hartley (1864–1907), convicted in 1895 of killing Nevada state senator Murray D. Foley by gunshot
- Alice K. Hartley (1937–2017), American computer scientist and businesswoman
