= Simon S. Lam =

American computer scientist and academic (born 1947)

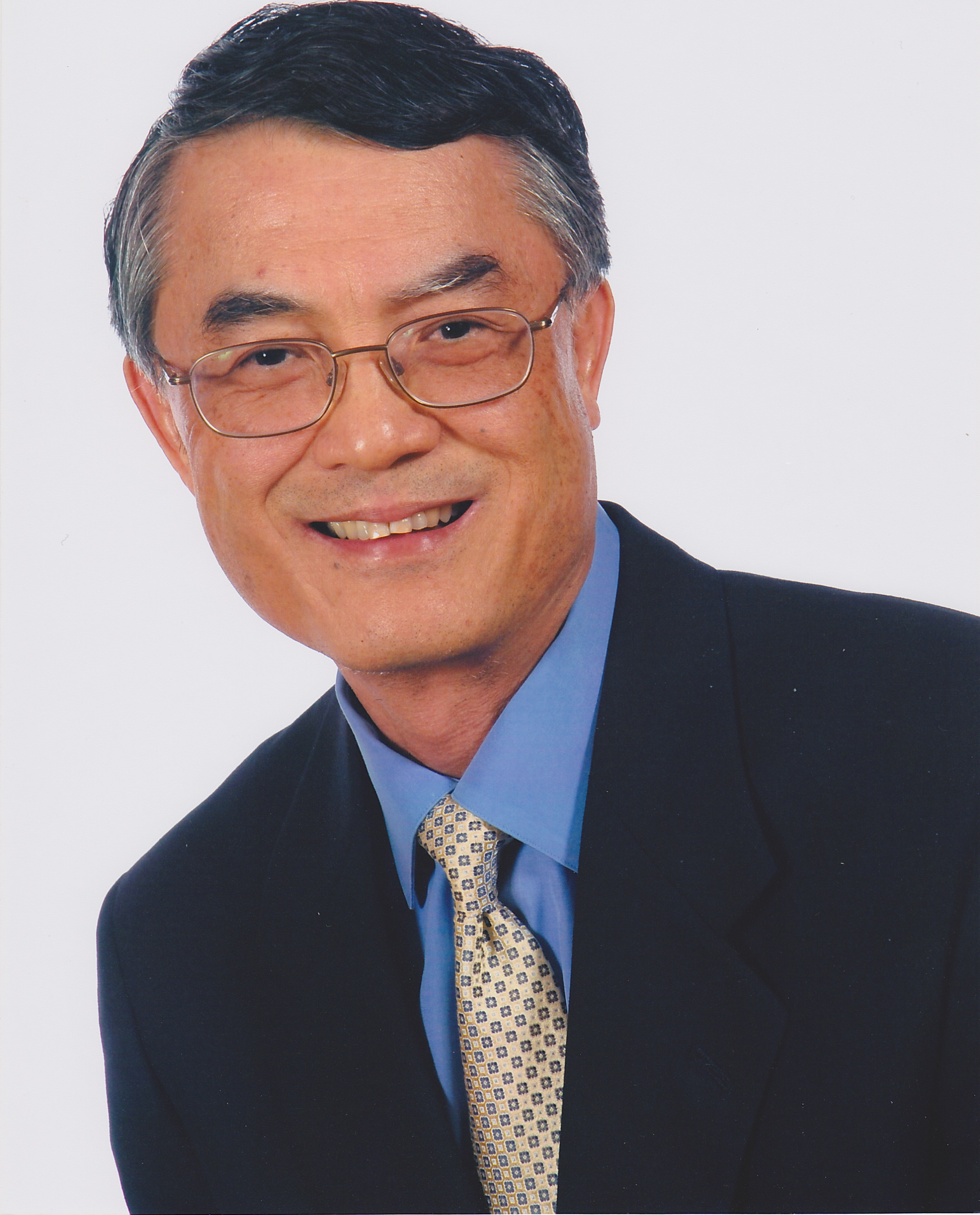
- Born: July 31, 1947 (age 79); Macau
- Citizenship: United States
- Education: Washington State University (BS), UCLA (MS, PhD)
- Known for: Inventing Secure Sockets; Secure Network Programming; Theory of Interfaces and Modules; Atomic Predicates for Network Verification; Adaptive Backoff algorithms
- Awards: Internet Hall of Fame (2023); Member of the National Academy of Engineering (2007); SIGCOMM Award (2004); ACM Software System Award (2004); IEEE W. Wallace McDowell Award (2004); ACM Fellow (1998); IEEE Fellow (1985); William R. Bennett Prize (2001); Leonard G. Abraham Award (1975))
- Scientific career
- Fields: Computer Science
- Workplaces: The University of Texas at Austin, IBM T. J. Watson Research Center
- Doctoral advisor: Leonard Kleinrock

Simon S. Lam is an American computer scientist and Internet pioneer. He retired in 2018 from The University of Texas at Austin as Professor Emeritus and Regents' Chair Emeritus in Computer Science #1. He made seminal and foundational contributions to the security of Internet applications including WWW applications. He also made important contributions to packet network verification, network protocol design, verification, and performance analysis.

Simon Lam pioneered security for Internet applications - for example, one result of his work that is visible to most users as the "s" in https, signifying a secure connection. He invented secure sockets in 1991. With funding from NSA, Professor Lam led a research group that implemented, in 1993, the first "secure sockets layer," named Secure Network Programming (SNP), which is a new sublayer between Internet's application and transport layers. By design, SNP exports a secure transport layer API closely resembling Berkeley sockets, to facilitate retrofitting pre-existing Internet applications with security measures.

This work was done when WWW was still in its infancy. SNP was published and presented on June 8, 1994 at the USENIX Summer Technical Conference. Subsequent secure sockets layers (SSL and TLS) re-implemented several years later using the architecture and key ideas first presented in SNP, enabled secure e-commerce on WWW (e.g., banking, shopping). TLS is also widely used to secure email and many other Internet applications.

For this contribution, Professor Lam and three graduate students in his research project won the 2004 ACM Software System Award. He was elected to the United States National Academy of Engineering in 2007. For inventing secure sockets and implementing the first secure sockets layer, he was inducted into the Internet Hall of Fame in 2023.

== Early life and education ==
Simon S. Lam was born in Macau (when it was a Portuguese colony) in 1947 with the family name 林 (Lam) and the given name 善成 (Sin Sing or Shin Sing). His family moved to Hong Kong in 1959. He received his secondary education from La Salle College, Kowloon, Hong Kong. He left Hong Kong in 1966 to study Electrical Engineering at Washington State University on a scholarship. He received the BSEE degree with Distinction in 1969 from Washington State University and was honored by the College of Engineering as the 1969 Outstanding Senior in Electrical Engineering.

Beginning Fall 1969, he attended graduate school at the UCLA School of Engineering on a 4-year Chancellor’s Teaching Fellowship. His doctoral dissertation on packet switching in a multi-access broadcast channel was supervised by Professor Leonard Kleinrock. From 1971 to 1974, he was a Postgraduate Research Engineer and later a Postdoctoral Scholar at the ARPA Network Measurement Center, UCLA, where he worked on the packet satellite project of ARPANET.

== Career and professional service ==
From 1974 to 1977, he was a Research Staff Member at the IBM T. J. Watson Research Center, Yorktown Heights, New York. In August 1977, he joined The University of Texas at Austin as an Assistant Professor of Computer Science. He was promoted to Associate Professor in 1979, to Full Professor in 1983, appointed to the endowed David Bruton Jr. Centennial Professorship in 1985, and the Regents Chair in Computer Science #1 in 2001. He served as Department Chair from 1992 to 1994.

Professor Lam was active in professional service for the networking research communities of ACM SIGCOMM, IEEE Computer Society, IEEE Communications Society, and National Science Foundation. His most notable professional service contributions include the following: He co-founded the influential ACM SIGCOMM Conference and, as its first Technical Program Chair, promoted and hosted the inaugural conference in 1983 on the campus of The University of Texas at Austin. The conference was a huge success attended by ARPANET, CSNET, and European packet network researchers as well as many other computer scientists and engineers interested in the emergent packet switched networking techniques, protocols, and architectures. Ten years later, in 1993, Professor Lam co-founded the International Conference on Network Protocols sponsored by IEEE Computer Society. From 1994 to 1998, he was Editor-in-Chief of the IEEE/ACM Transactions on Networking which was the first journal jointly published by ACM and IEEE.

== Major awards ==
=== ACM SIGCOMM Award ===
Simon Lam received the 2004 ACM SIGCOMM Award for lifetime contribution to the field of communication networks with the citation "in recognition of his vision, breadth, and rigor in contributing to, among other areas: secure network communication, the analysis of network and multiaccess protocols, the analysis of queueing networks, and the design of mechanisms for quality of service."

=== National Academy of Engineering ===
In 2007, Simon Lam was elected to the United States National Academy of Engineering, widely considered among the highest honors to be earned in the engineering and technology professions, for "contributions to computer network protocols and network security services.”

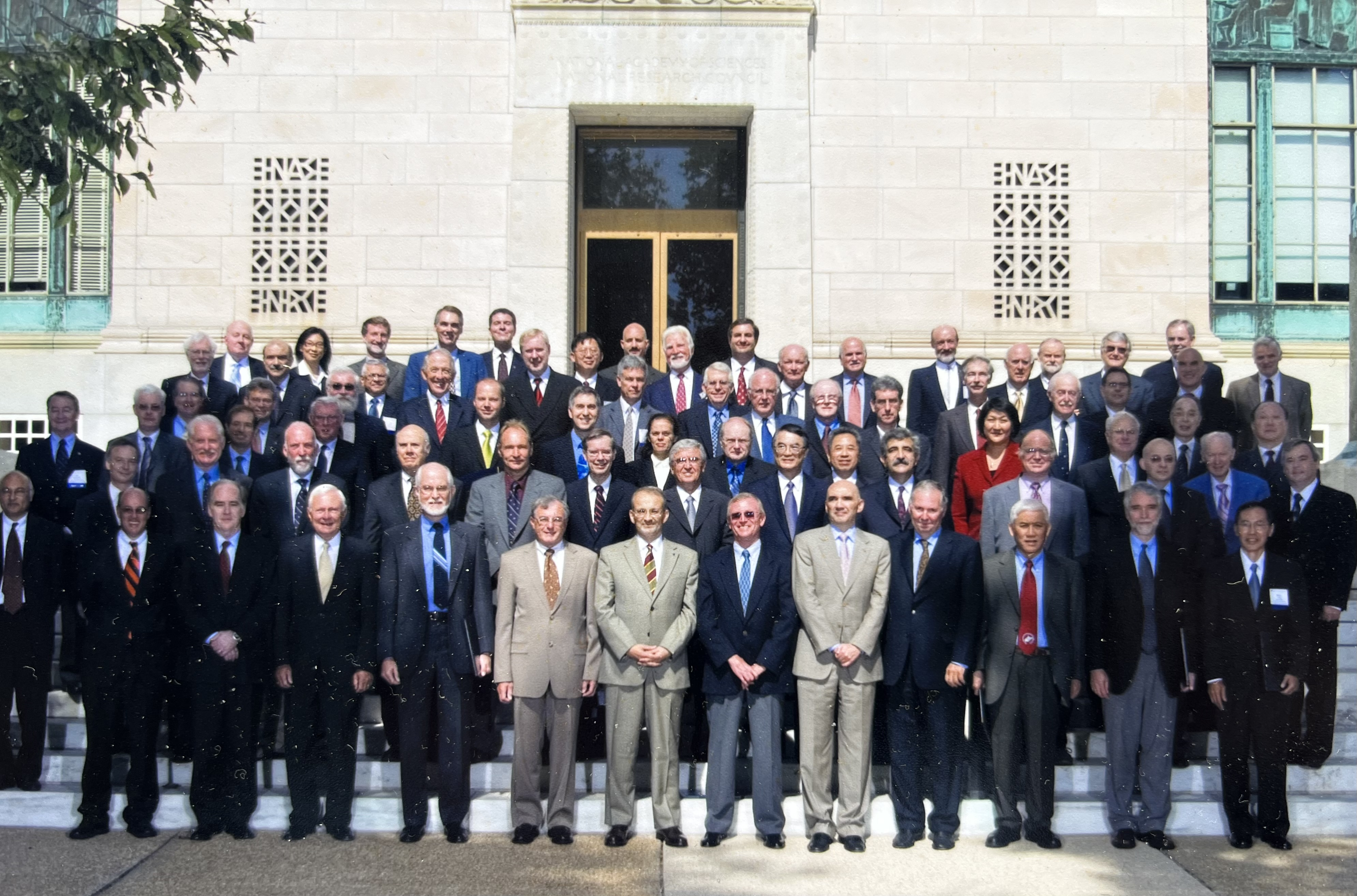
National Academy of Engineering Class of 2007

=== ACM Software System Award for Secure Network Programming ===
Inspired by his work on a theory of interfaces and modules, Simon Lam conceived a new security sublayer in the Internet protocol stack in 1990. He wrote a grant proposal to the NSA INFOSEC University Research Program entitled, “Applying a Theory of Modules and Interfaces to Security Verification.” The project was funded from June 1991 to June 1993. Lam, with the help of three graduate students, invented secure sockets for securing Internet applications (providing end-point authentication, data confidentiality, and data integrity, etc.). In 1993, they implemented the first secure sockets layer, named Secure Network Programming (SNP), with the goal of achieving “secure network programming for the masses.” They demonstrated SNP to the project's NSA program manager. They presented the case for secure sockets and SNP performance results at the USENIX Summer Technical Conference on June 8, 1994.

SNP was designed as an application sublayer on top of transport-layer sockets. It provides to Internet applications a secure sockets API that closely resembles the sockets API. The SNP approach was novel and created a paradigm shift away from contemporary research on security for distributed applications (e.g., MIT’s Kerberos, 1988-1992). This approach enabled secure e-commerce a few years later. SNP won the 2004 ACM Software System Award. Subsequent secure sockets layers (SSL and TLS), re-implemented years later using the architecture and key ideas in SNP, are widely used for securing transactions between Web browsers and servers for e-commerce, as well as other Internet applications including email, instant messaging, and VoIP.

=== W. Wallace McDowell Award ===
He was awarded the 2004 W. Wallace McDowell Award with the citation “For outstanding fundamental contributions in network protocols and security services.”

== See also ==
- List of Internet pioneers
- List of pioneers in computer science
- List of inventors
