= Matt Kaufmann =

American computer scientist

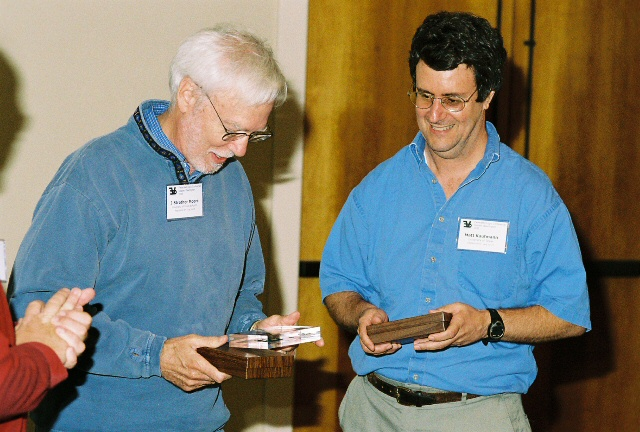
- Matt Kaufmann (right) with J Strother Moore 2006
- Citizenship: United States
- Occupation: Computer scientist
- Employer: University of Texas at Austin
- Known for: Lisp programming language, The Boyer-Moore Theorem Prover
- Awards: ACM Software System Award

Matt Kaufmann is a senior research scientist in the department of computer sciences at the University of Texas at Austin, United States. He was a recipient of the 2005 ACM Software System Award along with Robert S. Boyer and J Strother Moore, for his work on the Boyer-Moore Theorem Prover.
