= Secure Network Programming =

Prototype of Secure Sockets Layer

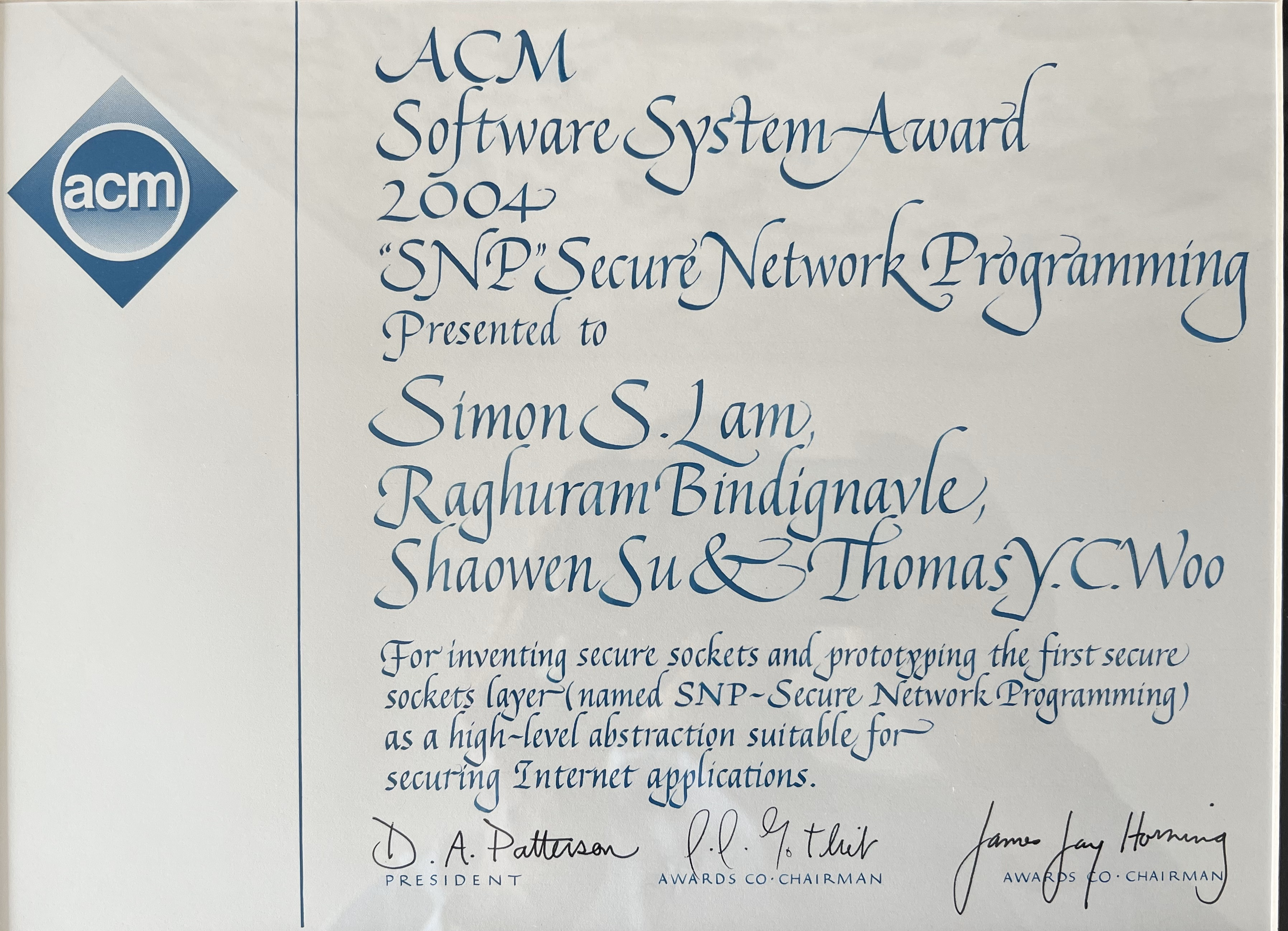
For inventing secure sockets in 1991 and implementing the first secure sockets layer, named SNP, in 1993.

Secure Network Programming (SNP) is a prototype of the first Secure Sockets Layer, designed and built in 1993 by the Networking Research Laboratory at the University of Texas at Austin, led by Simon S. Lam.

== History ==
This work was published in the 1994 USENIX Summer Technical Conference. For this project, the authors won the 2004 ACM Software System Award.

Simon S. Lam was inducted into the Internet Hall of Fame (2023) for "inventing secure sockets in 1991 and implementing the first secure sockets layer, named SNP, in 1993."

This work began in 1991 as a theoretical investigation by Lam and Shankar on the formal meaning of a protocol layer satisfying an upper interface specification as a service provider and a lower interface specification as a service consumer. A case study of adding a security layer between the application layer and network layer was presented.

Simon Lam wrote a proposal to the National Security Agency (NSA) in 1991 to investigate how to apply the theory of interfaces and modules to security verification. The proposal was funded from 6/28/1991 to 6/27/1993. At that time, there were three well-known authentication systems built (MIT's Kerberos) or being developed (DEC's SPX and IBM's KryptoKnight). All of these systems suffered from a common drawback; namely, they did not export a clean and easy-to-use interface that could be readily used by Internet applications. For example, it would take a tremendous amount of effort to "kerberize" an existing distributed application.

Toward the goal of "secure network programming for the masses", the inventors of SNP conceived secure sockets as a high-level abstraction suitable for securing Internet applications. In 1993, they designed and built a prototype of SNP. Designed as an application sublayer on top of sockets, SNP provides a user interface closely resembling sockets. This resemblance was by design so that security could be retrofitted into existing socket programs with only minor modifications. Also, with such a sublayer carefully designed and its implementation thoroughly debugged, it can be easily used by any Internet application that uses sockets for end-to-end communications. This is a natural idea in hindsight but, in 1993, it was novel and a paradigm shift from mainstream network security research at that time. SNP was presented to their NSA manager in June 1993.

SNP's secure sockets support both stream and datagram semantics with security guarantees (i.e., data origin authenticity, data destination authenticity, data integrity, and data confidentiality). The modular architecture and all of the key ideas and design choices in SNP were adopted in subsequent secure sockets layers, including: placing authenticated communication endpoints in the application layer, use of public-key cryptography for authentication, a handshake protocol for establishing session state including a shared secret, use of symmetric-key cryptography for data confidentiality, and managing contexts and credentials in the secure sockets layer.

The paper presented on June 8, 1994, at the USENIX Summer Technical Conference includes the system design together with performance measurement results from the prototype implementation to clearly demonstrate the practicality of a secure sockets layer.

SNP pioneered secure sockets for Internet applications in general, independently and concurrently with the design and development of the HTTP protocol for the world-wide web which was still in its infancy in 1993. Subsequent secure sockets layers (SSL by Netscape and TLS by IETF), implemented several years later using the modular architecture and key ideas first presented in SNP, enabled secure e-commerce between browsers and servers. The primary contributions of the later SSL and TLS were the inclusion of up-to-date and stronger cryptographic algorithms, redesign of the handshake protocol, and TLS's continual mitigation against known attacks. Today, many other Internet applications (including email) use HTTPS, which consists of HTTP running over a secure sockets layer.
