= Eric Bina =

American computer programmer

- Born: Eric J. Bina; October 25, 1964 (age 61); Champaign, Illinois
- Occupation: Programmer
- Years active: 1991–2011
- Known for: Co–founder of Mosaic, and Netscape
- Awards: ACM Software System Award

Eric J. Bina (born October 1964) is an American software programmer who is the co-creator of Mosaic and the co-founder of Netscape. In 1993, Bina along with Marc Andreessen authored the first version of Mosaic while working as a programmer at National Center for Supercomputing Applications (NCSA) at the University of Illinois at Urbana-Champaign.

Bina attended the University of Illinois at Urbana-Champaign, graduating from there with a Bachelor of Science degree in Computer Science in 1986 and a master's degree in 1988. He joined NCSA in 1991 as a programmer. There, Bina and Andreessen started working on Mosaic in December 1992 and had a working version by March 1993. Mosaic was posted to the Internet and is famed as the first killer application that popularized the Internet. He is one of the five inaugural inductees to the World Wide Web Hall of Fame announced at the first international conference on the World Wide Web in 1994.

In 1995, Bina and Andreessen were awarded the ACM Software System Award.

In 2010, Bina and Andreessen were inducted into the University of Illinois Engineering Hall of Fame.

== Sources ==
Inventor of the Week Archive
