= David Smith (baseball historian) =

Baseball historian

Dave Smith
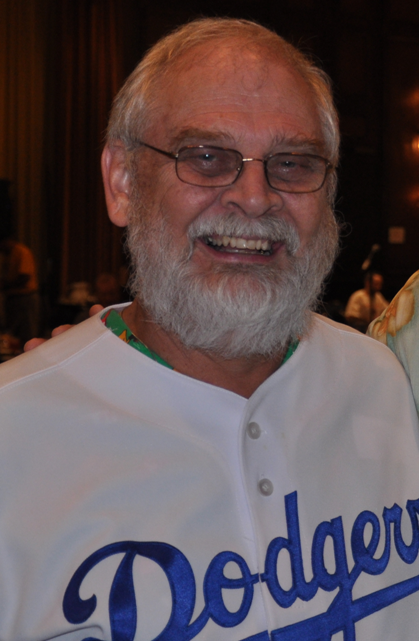
- Dave Smith c. 2018
- Born: March 17, 1948 (age 78); Dayton, Ohio, U.S.
- Education: University of California, San Diego (B.A.); Indiana University (M.A.); University of Wisconsin-Madison (Ph.D.)
- Occupations: Academic, Microbiologist; Baseball historian, Statistician
- Known for: Founder of Retrosheet
- Spouse: Amy Smith
- Website: retrosheet.org

David W. Smith (born March 17, 1948) is an American microbiologist, baseball historian and analyst, and statistician. He is best known as the founder of Retrosheet, a volunteer organization whose mission is to collect, digitize, and distribute play-by-play accounts from every game in Major League Baseball history. Additionally, Smith also writes research articles on baseball. Smith's work in baseball research has been widely praised and he has received a number of awards for his work, including from the Society for American Baseball Research and the Baseball Reliquary.

== Early life and career ==
Smith was born in Dayton, Ohio on March 17, 1948. His family moved to Connecticut when he was two before eventually settling in San Diego, California. Smith became a baseball fan at a very young age and was a fan of the Los Angeles Dodgers before the team even moved to the West Coast, seeing his first game between the Dodgers and the Philadelphia Phillies in 1958; the first at-bat he saw was between Richie Ashburn of the Phillies and Sandy Koufax of the Dodgers – both future Hall of Famers.

After graduating high school, Smith graduated from the University of California, San Diego with bachelor's degree in biology, and from Indiana University with a master's degree in microbiology. He earned his PhD from the University of Wisconsin–Madison and did two years of postgraduate work at the University of California, Los Angeles.

From 1975 to 2014, Smith worked as a professor of microbiology (with an emphasis on ecology, genetics, and evolution) at the University of Delaware, during which time he wrote a number of scientific papers and two textbooks on microbiology. He was the director of the undergraduate biology program and the grievance officer of the Delaware chapter of the American Association of University Professors. He won the university's Excellence in Teaching Award in 1977, and was Faculty Senate President in 1983–1984.

=== Early baseball research ===
Smith developed an interest in baseball scorekeeping as a young fan of the Los Angeles Dodgers. Between 1962 and 1965, he recorded approximately 100 Dodgers games in scorebooks while following the team's radio broadcasts. In 1973, he acquired scorebooks kept by Los Angeles Times sportswriter Frank Finch, adding several hundred historical games to his collection.

While studying biology at the University of California, San Diego, Smith programmed a computerized version of the APBA tabletop baseball game. Comparing its simulated outcomes with actual baseball results contributed to his interest in using historical play-by-play records to investigate questions about the game.

Smith joined the Society for American Baseball Research (SABR) in 1977 and became involved with its Statistical Analysis Committee, whose participants included Pete Palmer and Dick Cramer. In a study published in the 1980 Baseball Research Journal, Smith used historical Dodgers scoresheets to analyze the effects of Maury Wills' base-stealing on runs and the performance of subsequent batters.

=== Founding of Retrosheet ===
Smith became involved with Project Scoresheet in 1987 and volunteered to score Baltimore Orioles games during the 1988 season. He worked with programmer David Nichols on adapting Project Scoresheet's software for entering older games into a computer-readable play-by-play format.

Following the 1988 season, Smith obtained permission to copy historical Orioles scorebooks preserved by the team's public-relations department. The arrangement was facilitated through contacts including statistician Pete Palmer, Orioles researcher Eddie Epstein, and public-relations officials Bob Brown and Rick Vaughn. Smith borrowed and copied 30 binders of records, adding approximately 4,000 games to his historical collection.

In 1989, Smith founded Retrosheet, a project to collect, preserve, digitize, and make available accounts of historical Major League Baseball games. Working with volunteers and contacts in professional baseball, Smith sought records from teams, sportswriters, and private collections to assemble an archive of play-by-play information that could be processed and analyzed electronically.

=== Retrosheet leadership ===
Retrosheet was incorporated as a nonprofit corporation in Delaware in March 1994. At its first board meeting, held during SABR's June 1994 convention, Smith was elected president and chair of the board. The other original directors were Sherri Nichols, David Vincent, Luke Kraemer, and Ron Rakowski. The board also considered policies concerning conflicts of interest and the distribution of its data.

The organization adopted a model under which its digitized historical game data would be distributed without charge, with attribution to Retrosheet. Smith and the board developed policies intended to maintain a volunteer-run organization and avoid financial conflicts over the use of contributed records.

Smith served as Retrosheet's president through 2021. He was succeeded in 2022 by Tom Thress and remained on the board as treasurer.

== Works on baseball ==
=== Contribution to books ===
- Total Baseball
- Vincent, David W.; Spatz, Lyle; Smith, David W. (2001). The Midsummer Classic: The Complete History of Baseball's All-Star Game. Bison Books. ISBN 978-0803292734.

=== Articles for SABR Journal ===
- The 1966 Orioles: More than Frank Robinson
- Time Between Pitches: Cause of Long Games?
- Why do games take so long?
- Did Sign Stealing Make A Major Difference in the 1951 Pennant Race?
- The protested Dodgers-Cardinals game of July 20, 1947
- Coming from Behind: Patterns of Scoring and Their Relation to Winning
- Sunny Jim Bottomley’s Big Day
- Effect of Batting Order (Not Lineup) on Scoring
- Does Walking the Leadoff Batter Lead to Big Innings?
- Do Batters Learn During a Game? Part I
- Do Batters Learn During a Game? Part II
- Maury Wills and the Value of a Stolen Base
