= Tom Gruber =

American computer scientist, inventor, and entrepreneur

- Born: 1959 (age 66–67)
- Education: University of Massachusetts Amherst (PhD)
- Occupations: Computer Scientist; Inventor; Entrepreneur
- Known for: Co-founder of Siri Inc.

Thomas Robert Gruber (born 1959) is an American computer scientist, inventor, and entrepreneur with a focus on systems for knowledge sharing and collective intelligence. He did foundational work in ontology engineering and is well known for his definition of ontologies in the context of artificial intelligence.

In 2007 Gruber co-founded Siri Inc., which created the Siri intelligent personal assistant and knowledge navigator. Siri Inc. was acquired by Apple in 2010, and Siri is now an integral part of iOS.

== Biography ==
Gruber studied psychology and computer science at the Loyola University New Orleans, where he received a double major B.S. in 1981 and graduated summa cum laude. He designed and implemented a computer-assisted instruction (CAI) system for programmed-curriculum courses. It was the first of its kind at the university and is used routinely by the Psychology department for introductory courses. In 1984 he received a M.S. in Computer and Information Science at the University of Massachusetts Amherst. For his Master's research, Gruber designed and implemented an intelligent communication prosthesis assistant, a computer system which enables people with severe physical disabilities who cannot otherwise speak to communicate in natural language presented in displayed, written, or spoken form. Four years later in 1988 at the University of Massachusetts Amherst he received a Ph.D. in Computer and Information Science with the dissertation "The Acquisition of Strategic Knowledge". His dissertation research addressed a critical problem for Artificial Intelligence—knowledge acquisition—with a computer assistant that acquires strategic knowledge from experts.

From 1988 to 1994 Gruber was a research associate at the Knowledge Systems Laboratory of the Computer Science Department at Stanford University. He worked on the How Things Work, SHADE, and Knowledge Sharing Technology projects. In 1994 he became Senior Project Leader, Enterprise Integration Technologies and proposed and designed several projects using the Internet to create shared, virtual environments for collaborative learning and work (for ARPA, NASA, and NIST). During this time, he also proposed a business plan for corporate training. In 1995, he founded and became Chief Technology Officer of Intraspect Software, an enterprise software company that did early commercial work on collaborative knowledge management. Intraspect applications help professional people collaborate in large distributed communities, continuously contributing to a collective body of knowledge.

Gruber has been a member of journal editorial boards of the "Knowledge Acquisition", "IEEE Expert" and "International Journal of Human-Computer Studies".

== Work ==
Gruber's research interests in the 1990s were in the field of developing intelligent networked software to support human collaboration and learning. Areas of specialty include knowledge acquisition, knowledge representation, computer-supported collaborative work, computer-mediated communication for design, and knowledge sharing technology.

In 1994 he was responsible for the creation of hypermail, an email to web gateway software that saw extensive use after a rewrite by a different programmer.

In 2007 Gruber co-founded Siri Inc., which created the Siri intelligent personal assistant and knowledge navigator. Siri Inc. was acquired by Apple in 2010, and Siri is now an integral part of iOS. In 2016, Siri was added to macOS in macOS Sierra.

In April 2017 Gruber spoke on the TED stage about his vision for the future of "humanistic AI" especially in regard to augmentation of human capacities such as memory. He is quoted saying, "We are in the middle of a renaissance in AI. Every time a machine gets smarter, we get smarter."

== Publications ==
Gruber published several articles and some books, most notably:

- Thomas R. Gruber (1989). The Acquisition of Strategic Knowledge. Perspectives in Artificial Intelligence. Vol. 4. Academic Press. ISBN 9780123047540.
- 1993. "Toward Principles for the Design of Ontologies Used for Knowledge Sharing". In: International Journal Human-Computer Studies. Vol 43, p. 907-928.
- 1993. "A Translation Approach to Portable Ontology Specifications". In: Knowledge Acquisition, 5(2):199-220, 1993
- 2008, Ontology. Entry in the Encyclopedia of Database Systems, Ling Liu and M. Tamer Özsu (Eds.), Springer-Verlag, to appear in 2008.

== See also ==
- IDEF5
- Social Semantic Web
- Soft ontology
