= Marcus Birkenkrahe =

German computer scientist and physicist

- Born: Speh; 29 December 1963; Bad Kreuznach, Germany
- Education: University of Hamburg
- Organization: Augustana University
- Title: Associate Professor of Computer Science
- Awards: Best of Web Award 1994

Marcus Birkenkrahe (born 29 December 1963 as Marcus Speh in Bad Kreuznach, Germany) is a German physicist and computer scientist. He is an associate professor of computer science at Augustana University in Sioux Falls, South Dakota.

After obtaining his Abitur in 1983, Birkenkrahe studied physics, mathematics and chemistry at the University of Hamburg. In 1994, he worked as a research assistant at DESY in Zeuthen near Berlin and earned his doctorate with a dissertation on multigrid computations for lattice gauge theories using object-oriented, literate programming.

As co-founder and chairman of the Globewide Network Academy (GNA), he received the awards for "Best Campus-Wide Information System" and "Best Educational Site" at the First World-Wide Web conference (WWW1) in Geneva, Switzerland in 1994. Between 1995 and 2001 he worked as a corporate IT executive for Accenture and Royal Dutch Shell.

He was a Fellow of the Royal Society for the encouragement of Arts, Manufactures & Commerce (RSA), London (1998–2008) and has been a registered expert and reviewer for knowledge management for the European Union since 1999. In 2002, he served as a visiting professor for knowledge management at the University of Auckland Business School where he won the "Best Paper 2002" award of the University of Auckland Business Review.

From 2007 to 2023, Birkenkrahe was a professor of management information systems at the Berlin School of Economics and Law, a German University of Applied Sciences and President's Commissioner for E-Learning (2008–2020).

In 2021 he joined the Lyon College in Batesville, Arkansas as visiting professor of Data Science on a leave of absence from the Berlin School of Economics and Law. In 2022 he accepted a permanent position as associate professor of computer and data science at Lyon College. In 2026 he joined Augustana University as associate professor of computer science.

He serves as member of the editorial board for the International Journal of Big Data Management and of the International Journal of Data Science.
