= Randy Terbush =

Randy Terbush is the CTO of Lifeguard Health Networks, a next generation mobile health management network. Terbush founded Covalent Technologies one of the early companies involved in Web Server software. Terbush was later the CTO of Enterprise Technology Architecture and Strategy at Automatic Data Processing, the largest payroll processing company in the world.

A long time participant in Open-source software development, Terbush is recognized as one of the eight co-founders of the Apache Software Foundation. In 1999, this group was awarded the ACM Software System Award. In 2001–2002, Terbush also participated as a Director of the Open Source Development Labs, which was dissolved and succeeded by the Linux Foundation.
