= SWISH-E =

Software to index collections of documents

Swish-e
- Developer(s): originated by Kevin Hughes
- Stable release: 2.4.7 / April 5, 2009
- Operating system: Windows, most Unix
- Type: search engine, open-source
- License: GNU General Public License
- Website: http://swish-e.org/ (Offline)

SWISH-E stands for Simple Web Indexing System for Humans - Enhanced. It is used to index collections of documents ranging up to one million documents in size and includes import filters for many document types.

SWISH-E is based on SWISH, developed by Kevin Hughes. When Kevin Hughes stopped maintaining it, Roy Tennant (then at the University of California, Berkeley Library) requested in the mid-1990s to take responsibility for developing it further as a web indexing tool. Hughes assented, and for several years afterwards UC Berkeley Library staff developers and other volunteers maintained and enhanced it. It is no longer maintained, with an offline website and an archived repository at GitHub.

== See also ==
- the Najdi project from North Macedonia was developed on top of a Swish-e foundation
