= Allan Roth =

Canadian sports statistician (1917 – 1992)

- Roth in his Brooklyn office, c. 1952
- Born: Abraham Roth; May 10, 1917; Montreal, Quebec, Canada
- Died: March 3, 1992 (aged 74); Culver City, California, U.S.
- Education: McGill University
- Spouse: Esther Machlovitch (m. 1940; div. 1965)
- Children: 2
- Baseball career
- Statistician for the Brooklyn/Los Angeles Dodgers (1947-1964)

Member of the Canadian

Baseball Hall of Fame
- Induction: 2010

Allan Roth (born Abraham Roth; May 17, 1917 – March 3, 1992) was a Canadian baseball and hockey statistician and an early proponent of sabermetrics in baseball. During his career, Roth worked for the Brooklyn/Los Angeles Dodgers as their official statistician from 1947 to 1964.

Roth is considered by many to be the father of modern sabermetrics. He was the first full-time statistician ever employed by a Major League Baseball team, creating a number of new baseball statistics over the course of his work.

== Early life ==
Roth was born in Montreal, Quebec to Jewish immigrants Rose (née Silverheart) and Nathan Roth. He was second of three children, born after his older brother Max and his younger sister Sylvia.

Roth attended Strathcona Academy and, in his free time, compiled statistics for his hometown Montreal Royals of the International League. Additionally, he also compiled hockey statistics. He attended and graduated from McGill University. He would legally change his name from "Abraham" to "Allan" in 1941.

In 1941, Roth was hired by Frank Calder, president of the National Hockey League, as the official statistician of the league after he showed Calder his compiled hockey statistics. This came after he tried to find a job with Larry MacPhail, the general manager of the Brooklyn Dodgers, who was uninterested in Roth's work.

Three months after his work with the NHL began, however, Roth was drafted into the Canadian Army. He worked in the unit charged with organizing reinforcement contingents for Canadian Forces in Europe, where he managed all the records and statistics. In January 1944, he was discharged from the Army due to epilepsy. After being discharged, he began to write articles in the sports section of the Montreal Standard and compiled statistics for the Montreal Canadiens.

In 1944, Roth met with Branch Rickey, who had replaced MacPhail as the general manager of the Dodgers, sending him a four-page letter contained proposals to track a wide range of statistics. Rickey was impressed with Roth's work and offered him a job with the Dodgers. However, visa issues after World War II prevented Roth from taking up his new position until 1947.

== Baseball career ==
Upon taking up his new position, Roth proceeded to break down statistics into various categories such as performance against left-handers and right-handers, in the various ballparks, in situations with runners in scoring position, and performance in different ball-strike counts. At the end of each season, he would compile the numbers on each player, including his newer, advanced stats. He also spent the next eighteen seasons recording every pitch thrown in a Dodgers game as well as their outcome.

After Rickey departed from the Dodgers, new owner Walter O'Malley moved Roth to the press and public relations operation. As a result, his analyses and statistics began to appear regularly in the newspaper columns. Roth ran a publication called Press Box Pickups, which contained his work as well as promotional material and was distributed in the press box during gamedays. He was also put in charge of providing statistics for the team's yearbooks and media guides.

Initially working from behind home plate, Roth was moved to the radio booth in 1954 where he provided statistics and facts to broadcasters. He quickly struck up a friendship with Dodgers broadcaster Vin Scully. From the booth, Roth also got a link to the press box and often provided statistics and analyses to reporters for their stories.

After the Dodgers moved to Los Angeles, Roth began to attend spring training in Vero Beach, Florida. He began to meet up with each player and would evaluate their performance from the previous year, emphasizing their strengths and weaknesses and suggesting changes to help the player improve their performance. Future Hall of Fame pitcher Sandy Koufax credited Roth with helping him turn around his career through these sessions.

Roth is credited with inventing on-base percentage and showing how it was more important than batting average. He also created an early version of saves for relief pitchers in 1951. The save was adopted in 1964 and became an official statistic in 1969, both times with the help of Jerome Holtzman and with a slightly different formula than that of Roth's.

Roth was fired by the Dodgers during the 1964 season after it was discovered that he was having an extramarital affair with an African-American woman, when the two had a fight in the corridor of a Philadelphia hotel. O'Malley disliked controversy and, as interracial relationships were frowned upon at the time, the press were told that Roth had resigned because he was tired of travelling. The real reason was revealed decades later by Buzzie Bavasi, Dodgers' general manager in the 1960s, in a 1994 interview.

Roth continued to contribute to baseball afterwards, writing articles for The Sporting News and editing Who's Who in Baseball. Roth also contributed statistical data for Sandy Koufax's autobiography, Koufax. In 1966, he was hired by NBC to provide statistical data to broadcasters Curt Gowdy and Tony Kubek for the Game of the Week, All-Star Games and the World Series. A few years later, he moved to ABC and provided the same service. Roth retired in the 1980s due to ill health.

== Preservation of statistical records ==
Roth kept detailed records of Dodgers games that went beyond conventional box scores. His scoresheets recorded play-by-play and pitch-by-pitch information; from 1947 into 1951, he also documented the type and location of individual pitches.

In the period surrounding Roth's death in March 1992, Los Angeles baseball researcher David Stephan worked with Roth's family to organize his extensive collection of scoresheets and other baseball papers. Stephan coordinated arrangements for the papers to be transferred to the library of the Amateur Athletic Foundation of Los Angeles. The foundation's library director, Wayne Wilson, authorized Retrosheet to copy Roth's scoresheets, and Retrosheet volunteers David and Sherri Nichols undertook the copying of the unusually large sheets.

In October 1994, Retrosheet founder David Smith reported that the collection contained approximately 2,700 game scoresheets, of which about 750 had been entered into the organization's computerized database. Smith described Roth's scoresheets as a centerpiece of Retrosheet's holdings.

=== Legacy ===
For his contributions to baseball, he was elected to the Canadian Baseball Hall of Fame in 2010. Statistician Bill James wrote that Roth "was decades ahead of his time" and was the person who "started it all" when it came to baseball statistical analysis. He was praised by Vin Scully and sportswriters Alan Schwarz and Dick Young for his groundbreaking statistical analyses.

The Society of American Baseball Research (SABR) named their Los Angeles chapter, where he was often attended meetings and showed his new workings during the offseasons, in his honor. In 2019, they posthumously awarded him the Henry Chadwick Award for his contributions to baseball research.

== Personal life ==
Roth married Esther Machlovitch in 1940. The couple had two children: a son named Michael, and a daughter named Andrea. They divorced in 1965, one year after his affair was discovered and he was fired by the Dodgers.

Roth died of a heart attack in Brotman Hospital in Culver City, California on March 3, 1992.
