= Larry Masinter =

American internet pioneer

- Spouse: Carol Masinter
- Awards: ACM Software System Award (1992)

Academic background
- Education: Stanford University
- Thesis: Global Program Analysis in an Interactive Environment (1980)
- Doctoral advisor: Terry Winograd
- Website: larrymasinter.net

Larry Melvin Masinter is an early internet pioneer and ACM Fellow. After attending Stanford University, he became a principal scientist of Xerox Artificial Intelligence Systems and author or coauthor of 26 of the Internet Engineering Task Force's Requests for Comments.

Masinter, who was raised in San Antonio, Texas, is now retired, with wife Carol Masinter, and working on projects for fellow Parkinsons patients.

== Stanford ==
Masinter received his PhD from Stanford University in 1980, writing a dissertation on "Global Program Analysis in an Interactive Environment." His advisor was Terry Winograd.

Masinter then worked on the PDP-10 version of Lisp and worked with Bill van Melle on Common Lisp.

== Xerox PARC ==
Masinter went to work for Xerox PARC in 1976. In 1981, Warren Teitelman and Masinter published a paper on Interlisp in IEEE Computer.

Masinter documented the failed attempt in 1982 to port Interlisp to the Berkeley Software Distribution (BSD) Unix on the VAX. This led to the initial Interlisp IDEs, for which Masinter was initially known.

Masinter later helped develop the URL standard, along with Mark McCahill and Tim Berners-Lee.

While at the Xerox Palo Alto Research Center in the 1980s, he began working on online document formats and accessibility options and helped define many of the standards used today. In 1992, an Association for Computing Machinery (ACM) Software System Award recognized the team of Daniel G. Bobrow, Richard R. Burton, L. Peter Deutsch, Ronald Kaplan, Larry Masinter, Warren Teitelman for their work on Interlisp. Masinter became an ACM fellow in 1999 for his work on Interlisp and creation of World Wide Web standards.

== Adobe ==
After Xerox, Masinter worked at AT&T Labs and Adobe for 18 years, doing pioneering work on document management and location technologies. He helped publish the PDF MIME type. At Adobe, Masinter was highly active in documenting a number of internet standards and contributed to a number of peer-reviewed journals. His work allowed tools such as the Apache HTTP Server to integrate MIME.

Masinter presented at the University of California, Irvine TWIST conference. He also collaborated with Nick Kew on the book The Apache Modules Book: Application Development with Apache and with Kim H. Veltman on her book, Understanding New Media: Augmented Knowledge & Culture.

== Internet Engineering Task Force RFCs ==
Masinter was involved with the IETF, helping to set standards from 1994 to 2017 primarily in URIs and HTTP. His contributions include the following:

- RFC 1737 Functional Requirements for Uniform Resource Names (K. Sollins, L. Masinter)
- RFC 1738 Uniform Resource Locators (URL) (T. Berners-Lee, L. Masinter, M. McCahill)
- RFC 1867 Form-based File Upload in HTML (E. Nebel, L. Masinter)
- RFC 2324 Hyper Text Coffee Pot Control Protocol (HTCPCP/1.0) (L. Masinter)
- RFC 2368 The mailto URL scheme (P. Hoffman, L. Masinter, J. Zawinski)
- RFC 2388 Returning Values from Forms: multipart/form-data (L. Masinter)
- RFC 2396 Uniform Resource Identifiers (URI): Generic Syntax (T. Berners-Lee, R. Fielding, L. Masinter)
- RFC 2397 The "data" URL scheme (L. Masinter)
- RFC 2532 Extended Facsimile Using Internet Mail (L. Masinter, D. Wing)
- RFC 2534 Media Features for Display, Print, and Fax (L. Masinter, D. Wing, A. Mutz, K. Holtman)
- RFC 2542 Terminology and Goals for Internet Fax (L. Masinter)
- RFC 2616 Hypertext Transfer Protocol—HTTP/1.1 (R. Fielding, J. Gettys, J. Mogul, H. Frystyk, L. Masinter, P. Leach, T. Berners-Lee)
- RFC 2718 Guidelines for new URL Schemes (L. Masinter, H. Alvestrand, D. Zigmond, R. Petke)
- RFC 2732 Format for Literal IPv6 Addresses in URL's (R. Hinden, B. Carpenter, L. Masinter)
- RFC 2854 The 'text/html' Media Type (D. Connolly, L. Masinter)
- RFC 2938 Identifying Composite Media Features (G. Klyne, L. Masinter)
- RFC 2972 Context and Goals for Common Name Resolution (N. Popp, M. Mealling, L. Masinter, K. Sollins)
- RFC 3470 Guidelines for the Use of Extensible Markup Language (XML) within IETF Protocols (S. Hollenbeck, M. Rose, L. Masinter)
- RFC 3553 An IETF URN Sub-namespace for Registered Protocol Parameters (M. Mealling, L. Masinter, T. Hardie, G. Klyne)
- RFC 3778 The application/pdf Media Type (E. Taft, J. Pravetz, S. Zilles, L. Masinter)
- RFC 3986 Uniform Resource Identifier (URI): Generic Syntax (T. Berners-Lee, R. Fielding, L. Masinter)
- RFC 4395 Guidelines and Registration Procedures for New URI Schemes (T. Hansen, T. Hardie, L. Masinter)
- RFC 6068 The 'mailto' URI Scheme (M. Duerst, L. Masinter, J. Zawinski)
- RFC 7578 Returning Values from Forms: multipart/form-data (L. Masinter)
- RFC 7995 PDF Format for RFCs (L. Masinter)
