= Pamela Faber =

American linguist

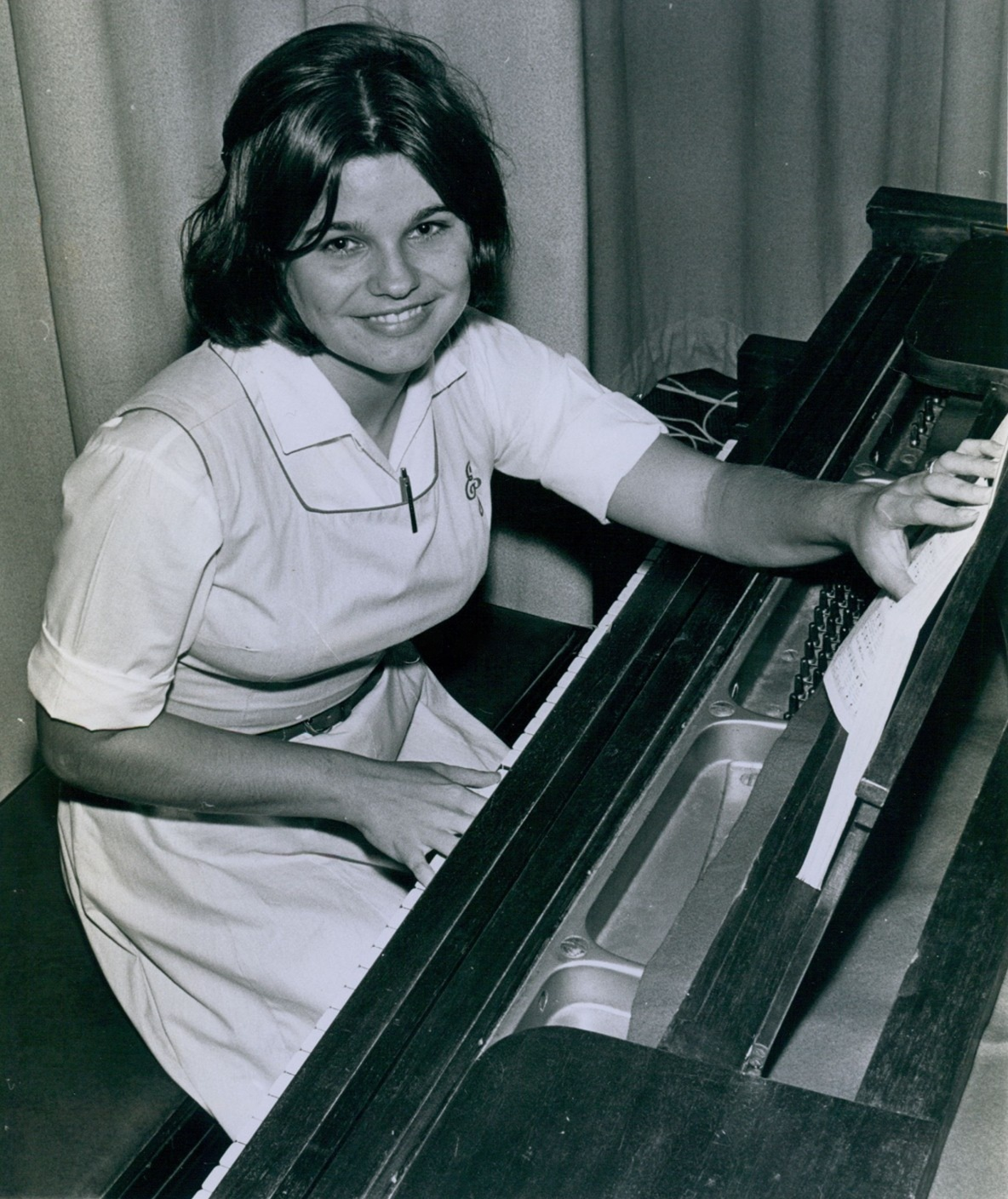
- Faber in 1966
- Born: 1950 (age 75–76); United States
- Education: University of North Carolina at Chapel Hill; University of Paris IV; University of Granada
- Known for: Frame-Based Terminology
- Scientific career
- Fields: Terminology, Specialized Translation, Cognitive Semantics, and Lexicography
- Workplaces: University of Granada
- Thesis: (1986)
- Website: https://lexicon.ugr.es/faber

Pamela Faber Benítez (born 1950) is an American/Spanish linguist. She has held the Chair of Translation and Interpreting at the Department of Translation and Interpreting of the University of Granada since 2001.

She received her Ph.D. from the University of Granada in 1986 and also holds degrees from the University of North Carolina at Chapel Hill and Paris-Sorbonne University.

== Research ==
Pamela Faber is best known for her works on the Functional Lexematic Model and her cognitive theory of Terminology called Frame-Based Terminology.

=== Functional Lexematic Model ===
The Functional Lexematic Model was elaborated by Leocadio Martín Mingorance and further developed by his collaborators Pamela Faber and Ricardo Mairal. It integrates Coşeriu's Theory of Lexematics and Dik's Functional Grammar.

The two main objectives sought within this lexicological model are:

1. the specification of the semantic architecture of the lexicon of a language, and
2. the representation of knowledge based on the linguistic encoding found in dictionary entries.

These objectives are mutually dependent in the sense that the former serves as the input for the latter.

=== Frame-Based Terminology ===
Frame-Based Terminology is a recent cognitive approach to Terminology developed by Pamela Faber and colleagues at the University of Granada. It was conceived within the context of the Functional Lexematic Model and Cognitive Linguistics.

Frame-Based Terminology focuses on:

1. conceptual organization;
2. the multidimensional nature of terminological units; and
3. the extraction of semantic and syntactic information through the use of multilingual corpora.

Within this context, Faber's current major project is called EcoLexicon, a terminological knowledge base on the Environment.

== Seminal publications ==
- Faber, Pamela (ed.). 2012. A Cognitive Linguistics View of Terminology and Specialized Language. Berlin, Boston: Mouton De Gruyter. (ISBN 978-3-11-027720-3).
- Faber, Pamela, Pilar León Araúz, and Juan Antonio Prieto Velasco. 2009. Semantic Relations, Dynamicity, and Terminological Knowledge Bases. Current Issues in Language Studies 1: 1-23.
- Faber, Pamela; Araúz, Pilar León; Velasco, Juan Antonio Prieto; Reimerink, Arianne (2007). "Linking Images and Words: the description of specialized concepts". International Journal of Lexicography. 20 (1): 39–65. doi:10.1093/ijl/ecl038.
- Faber, Pamela, Silvia Montero Martínez, María Rosa Castro Prieto, José Senso Ruiz, Juan Antonio Prieto Velasco, Pilar León Araúz, Carlos Márquez Linares, and Miguel Vega Expósito. 2006. Process-oriented terminology management in the domain of Coastal Engineering. Terminology 12, no. 2: 189-213. doi:10.1075/term.12.2.03fab.
- Faber, Pamela, Carlos Márquez Linares, and Miguel Vega Expósito. 2005. Framing Terminology: A Process-Oriented Approach. Meta : journal des traducteurs / Meta: Translators’ Journal 50, no. 4.
- Faber, Pamela, and Catalina Jiménez Hurtado. 2004. Traducción, lenguaje y cognición. Granada: Comares. (ISBN 9788484448945)
- Faber, Pamela, and Catalina Jiménez Hurtado. 2002. Investigar en terminología. Granada: Comares. (ISBN 9788484446323)
- Faber, Pamela, and Ricardo Mairal Usón. 1999. Constructing a Lexicon of English Verbs. Berlin: Mouton de Gruyter. (ISBN 9783110164169).
