= Patrick Lincoln =

American computer scientist

- Born: 1964 (age 61–62)
- Education: Massachusetts Institute of Technology; Stanford University
- Known for: Computer Security, Formal verification, Computational Biology, Nanotechnology
- Awards: SRI International Fellow 2005
- Scientific career
- Fields: Computer Science
- Workplaces: SRI International
- Doctoral advisor: John Mitchell

Patrick Denis Lincoln (born 1964) is an American computer scientist leading the Computer Science Laboratory (CSL) at SRI International. Educated at MIT and then Stanford, he joined SRI in 1989 and became director of the CSL around 1998. He previously held positions with ETA Systems, Los Alamos National Laboratory, and MCC.

== Education and early career ==
Lincoln received a bachelor of science in electrical engineering and computer science from the Massachusetts Institute of Technology in 1986, with the thesis "DisCoRd distributed combinator reduction, automatic parallelizing compiler" under thesis advisor Rishiyur Nikhil. While pursuing that degree, he held a position in ETA Systems' Software Division from 1982 to 1983; one at Los Alamos National Laboratory, Division C-10 from 1984 to 1985. After graduation, he held a position with MCC from 1986 to 1988 in their Software Technology and Advanced Computer Architecture departments.

Lincoln then attended Stanford University, from 1988 to 1992, earning a Ph.D. in computer science under advisor John Mitchell. Lincoln's doctoral dissertation was "Computational aspects of linear logic".

== Later career ==
In 1989, Lincoln joined SRI International's Computer Science Laboratory (CSL). He is the director of SRI's Computer Science Laboratory since 1998 and became Vice-President of Information and Computing Sciences in 2018. He is also the executive director of SRI's program for the Department of Homeland Security's Cyber Security Research and Development Center and co-director of the SRI Center for Computational Biology. He also leads numerous multidisciplinary research groups.

In 2013, he was featured in the BBC Horizon episode "Defeating the Hackers" and NOVA episode "Rise of the Hackers" describing his work on secure computing and cortical cryptography. This is focusing on how to store a password in someone's mind that they cannot directly recall; for example, by teaching them to play a song and measuring their reaction times. Those methods are theoretically resistant to rubber-hose cryptanalysis, where a user is coerced to give up a password or other key; if you don't know a password, you can't tell it to someone.

== Advisory boards and awards ==
He has served on the Defense Science Board task force on Science and Technology and of the Defense Science Board task force on Defensive Information Operations. He is serving on several advisory boards, including startups such as Neurome, Relational.AI, Blackhorse.

In 2005, Lincoln was named an SRI Fellow. In 2013, he and collaborators received the Best Paper Award at The 19th IEEE Pacific Rim International Symposium on Dependable Computing (PRDC).

== Selected publications ==
Patrick Lincoln holds over 240 scientific publications. He is amongst the computer scientists whose publications' h-index is above 50

- bRIGHT–Workstations of the Future and Leveraging Contextual Models, R Senanayake, G Denker, P Lincoln, International Conference on Human Interface and the Management of Information, 2018
- Model, data and reward repair: Trusted machine learning for Markov Decision Processes, S Ghosh, S Jha, A Tiwari, P Lincoln, X Zhu, 48th Annual IEEE/IFIP International Conference on Dependable Systems, 2018
- Probabilistic Modeling of Failure Dependencies Using Markov Logic Networks S Ghosh, W Steiner, G Denker, P Lincoln, Proceedings of the 19th IEEE Pacific Rim International Symposium on Dependable Computing (PRDC), 2013. (Best Paper Award)
- Neuroscience meets cryptography: designing crypto primitives secure against rubber hose attacks, H Bojinov, D Sanchez, P Reber, D Boneh, P Lincoln, Proceedings of the 21st USENIX conference on Security symposium, 33-33, 2012
- {TRIST}: Circumventing Censorship with Transcoding-Resistant Image Steganography, C Connolly, P Lincoln, I Mason, V Yegneswaran, 4th {USENIX} Workshop on Free and Open Communications on the Internet ({FOCI} 14), 2014
- Bootstrapping Communications into an Anti-Censorship System, P Lincoln, I Mason, P Porras, V Yegneswaran, Z Weinberg, J Massar, W A Simpson, P Vixie, D Boneh, 2nd USENIX Workshop on Free and Open Communications on the Internet, 2012
- Dynamic LDPC codes for nanoscale memory with varying fault arrival rates, S Gosh, P Lincoln, Design & Technology of Integrated Systems in Nanoscale Era (DTIS), 2011 6th International Conference on, vol., no., pp. 1,4, 2011
- Markov logic networks in health informatics, S Ghosh, P Lincoln, N Shankar, S Owre, S David, G Swan, Proceedings of ICML-MLGC, 2011
- Homogeneity as an advantage: It takes a community to protect an application, L Briesemeister, S Dawson, P Lincoln, H Saidi, J Thornton, G Durfee, P Kwan, E Stinson, A Oliner, J Mitchell, CollSec'10 Proceedings of the 2010 international conference on Collaborative methods for security and privacy, 2010
- Challenges in scalable fault tolerance, P Lincoln, Nanoscale Architectures, NANOARCH'09. IEEE/ACM International Symposium on Nanoscale Architectures, 2009
- Non-photolithographic nanoscale memory density prospects, A DeHon, S C Goldstein, P J Kuekes, P Lincoln, IEEE Transactions on Nanotechnology 4 (2), 215-228 2005 cited 117
- Unification and narrowing in Maude 2.4, M Clavel, F Durán, S Eker, S Escobar, P Lincoln, N Martí-Oliet, J Meseguer, C Talcott, Rewriting Techniques and Applications, 380-390 2009
- Early indicators of exposure to biological threat agents using host gene profiles in peripheral blood mononuclear cells, R Das, R Hammamieh, R Neill, GV Ludwig, S Eker, P Lincoln, P Ramamoorthy, A ..., BMC Infectious Diseases 8 (1), 2008
- Maude: Specification and programming in rewriting logic, M Clavel, F Durán, S Eker, P Lincoln, N Martı-Oliet, J Meseguer, JF Quesada, Theoretical Computer Science 285 (2), 187-243, 2002 cited 980
- Architectural support for copy and tamper resistant software, D Lie, C Thekkath, M Mitchell, P Lincoln, D Boneh, J Mitchell, M Horowitz, ACM SIGPLAN Notices 35 (11), 168-177, 2000 cited 852
- Using Maude, M Clavel, F Durán, S Eker, P Lincoln, N Martí-Oliet, J Meseguer, JF Quesada, Fundamental Approaches to Software Engineering, 371-374, 2000 cited 400
- A meta-notation for protocol analysis, I Cervesato, NA Durgin, PD Lincoln, JC Mitchell, A Scedrov, Computer Security Foundations Workshop, 1999. Proceedings of the 12th IEEE ..., 1999 cited 344
- Principles of maude, M Clavel, S Eker, P Lincoln, J Meseguer, Electronic Notes in Theoretical Computer Science 4, 65-89, 1996 cited 294
- Undecidability of bounded security protocols, NA Durgin, PD Lincoln, JC Mitchell, A Scedrov, In Workshop on Formal Methods and Security Protocols, 1999, cited 345
- The maude 2.0 system, M Clavel, F Durán, S Eker, P Lincoln, N Martí-Oliet, J Meseguer, C Talcott, Rewriting Techniques and Applications, 76-87, 2003 cited 370
- Efficient implementation of lattice operations, H Aït-Kaci, R Boyer, P Lincoln, R Nasr, ACM Transactions on Programming Languages and Systems 11 (1), 115-146, 1989 cited 310
- All about maude-a high-performance logical framework: how to specify, program and verify systems in rewriting logic, M Clavel, F Durán, S Eker, P Lincoln, N Martí-Oliet, J Meseguer, C Talcott, Springer-Verlag, 2007 cited 1235
- A probabilistic poly-time framework for protocol analysis, P Lincoln, J Mitchell, M Mitchell, A Scedrov, Proceedings of the 5th ACM conference on Computer and communications ... 1998, cited 246
- Decision problems for propositional linear logic, P Lincoln, J Mitchell, A Scedrov, N Shankar, Annals of pure and applied logic 56 (1), 239-311, 1992 cited 322
- Stochastic assembly of sublithographic nanoscale interfaces, A DeHon, P Lincoln, JE Savage, IEEE Transactions on Nanotechnology 2 (3), 165-174, 2003 cited 246
- Epidemic Profiles and Defense of Scale-Free Networks, L Briesemeister, P Lincoln, P Porras, Proceedings of 2003 ACM Workshop on Rapid Malcode, 67-75, 2003 cited 107
- All About Maude-A High-Performance Logical Framework, How to Specify, Program and Verify Systems in Rewriting Logic, volume 4350 of Lecture Notes in Computer Science, M Clavel, F Durán, S Eker, P Lincoln, N Martı-Oliet, J Meseguer, CL Talcott, Springer 4, 50-88, 2007 cited 205
- Pathway logic: Symbolic analysis of biological signaling, S Eker, M Knapp, K Laderoute, P Lincoln, J Meseguer, K Sonmez, Pacific symposium on Biocomputing 7, 400-412, 2002 cited 195
- Multiset rewriting and the complexity of bounded security protocols, N Durgin, P Lincoln, J Mitchell, A Scedrov, Journal of Computer Security 12 (2), 247-311, 2004 cited 194
- Maude manual (version 2.6), M Clavel, F Durán, S Eker, P Lincoln, N Martı-Oliet, J Meseguer, C Talcott, University of Illinois, Urbana-Champaign 1 (3), 4.6, 2011 cited 204
- A formally verified algorithm for interactive consistency under a hybrid fault model, P Lincoln, J Rushby, Fault-Tolerant Computing, 1993. FTCS-23. Digest of Papers., 1993. Also appears in FTCS: Highlights from 25 Years, 1995, pp. 438–447 cited 128
- On Shostak's decision procedure for combinations of theories, D Cyrluk, P Lincoln, N Shankar, Automated Deduction—CADE-13, 463-477, 1996 cited 109
- Privacy-preserving sharing and correction of security alerts, P Lincoln, P Porras, V Shmatikov, Proceedings of the 13th conference on USENIX Security Symposium-Volume 13, 17-17, 2004 cited 136

== Patents ==
Dr. Lincoln holds more than 40 patents in varied fields, including computer security, high-assurance systems, advanced user interfaces, computer networking, robotics, biotechnology, and nanotechnology. A selected subset is listed below.

Computer and Information Security

- Visually intuitive interactive network cyber defense, R Senanayake, PA Porras, PD Lincoln, US Patent App. 14/733,899, 2016
- Method, System and Device for Inferring a Mobile User's Current Context and Proactively Providing Assistance, K C Nitz, P D Lincoln, K L Myers, H H Bui, R Senanayake, G Denker, W Mark, N D Winarsky, S S Weiner, US Patent 13585003, 2014
- {TRIST}: Circumventing Censorship with Transcoding-Resistant Image Steganography, C Connolly, P Lincoln, I Mason, V Yegneswaran, 4th {USENIX} Workshop on Free and Open Communications on the Internet ({FOCI} 14), 2014
- System and method for authenticating a manufactured product with a mobile device, SM Eker, PD Lincoln, US Patent 8,534,543, 2013 and US Patent 8,534,544, 2013
- System and method using information based indicia for securing and authenticating transactions, PD Lincoln, N Shankar, US Patent 7,117,363, 2006 and US Patent 8,171,297, 2012
- Lattice-based security classification system and method, PD Lincoln, SM Dawson, P Samarati, SDC di Vimercati, US Patent 6,922,696, 2005

High-Assurance Systems

- Formal methods for modeling and analysis of hybrid systems, A Tiwari, PD Lincoln, US Patent 7,574,334, 2009

Advanced Collaborative Multimodal User Interfaces

- Adaptable actuated input device with integrated proximity detection, R Senanayake, G Denker, PD Lincoln, J Murray, SS Weiner, US Patent 20,130,215,038, 2013
- Method for adaptive interaction with a legacy software application, R Senanayake, G Denker, PD Lincoln, J Murray, SS Weiner, US Patent 20,130,215,005, 2013
- Adaptable input/output device, R Senanayake, G Denker, PD Lincoln, RD Kornbluh, SJ Lincoln, RP Heydt, H ..., US Patent 20,120,313,857 2012 and US Patent 20,120,313,854, 2012

Computer Networking

- Method and apparatus for processing network packets, PD Lincoln, SM Eker, US Patent 7,706,378, 2010
- Methods and apparatus for scalable, distributed management of virtual private networks, DWJ Stringer-Calvert, SM Dawson, PD Lincoln, US Patent 7,403,980, 2008
- Method and apparatus for providing scalable resource discovery, DWJ Stringer-Calvert, PD Lincoln, SM Dawson, US Patent 7,177,867, 2007
- Method and apparatus for generating, distributing and reconstructing deconstructed video, PD Lincoln, DWJ Stringer-Calvert, SM Dawson, US Patent 7,095,444, 2006

Robotics

- Wall crawling robots, RE Pelrine, H Prahlad, RD Kornbluh, PD Lincoln, S Stanford, US Patent 7,554,787, 2009, US Patent 7,554,784, 2009, and US Patent 8,111,500, 2012

Biotechnology

- Nanoscale array biomolecular bond enhancer device, PD Lincoln, US Patent App. 12/215,239, 2008, and US Patent 7,985,385, 2011
- Modeling and evaluation metabolic reaction pathways and culturing cells, SM Eker, PD Lincoln, PD Karp, P Romero, US Patent 7,308,363, 2007
- Biopolymer sequence comparison, LR Toll, PD Lincoln, PD Karp, K Sonmez, US Patent 7,133,781, 2006
- Data relationship model, K Sonmez, LR Toll, PD Lincoln, PD Karp, US Patent 7,039,238, 2006
- Method and apparatus for classifying nucleic acid responses to infectious agents, PD Lincoln, SM Eker, US Patent App. 11/335,982, 2006
- Method and apparatus for real-time correlation of data collected from biological sensors, PD Lincoln, ADJ Valdes, PA Porras, US Patent App. 11/073,257, 2005

Nanotechnology

- Nanoscale volumetric imaging device having at least one microscale device for electrically coupling at least one addressable array to a data processing means, PD Lincoln, CM Patton, US Patent 7,683,303, 2010
- Sublithographic nanoscale memory architecture, A Dehon, CM Lieber, PD Lincoln, J Savage, US Patent 6,963,077, 2005 and EP Patent 1,525,586, 2007
- Nanoscale selection circuit, A Dehon, PD Lincoln, CM Lieber, J Savage, EP Patent 1,758,126, 2007
- Stochastic assembly of sublithographic nanoscale interfaces, A DeHon, CM Lieber, PD Lincoln, JE Savage, US Patent 6,900,479, 2005 and EP Patent 1,525,585, 2005
- Three-dimensional memory array, A Dehon, PD Lincoln, CM Lieber, J Savage, EP Patent 1,630,819, 2009
