= Rob Hartill =

British computer programmer

Robert Hartill (born 30 January 1969 in Pontypridd, Wales) is a computer programmer and web designer. He created the first web-based version of the Internet Movie Database website. He has also worked on the Apache web server and played a key role in the initial growth of the World Wide Web.

Hartill grew up in Wales, and studied computer science at University of Wales College, Cardiff where he earned a BSc and PhD. In 1993, he became involved with the rec.arts.movies database that went on to become the Internet Movie Database (IMDb). On 5 August 1993 he announced the first web version of the database.

In 1994, Hartill moved to Los Alamos in New Mexico to work at the Los Alamos National Laboratory on the ArXiv.org e-print archive with Paul Ginsparg. At the same time, he was a co-founder of the Apache Software Foundation, and made many contributions to the early development of the Apache HTTP Server. In 1994, Hartill was one of six inductees in the World Wide Web Hall of Fame announced at the first international conference on the World Wide Web.

In 1996, the Internet Movie Database was founded, and Hartill returned to Ogmore-by-Sea in Wales before leaving the IMDb in 2000 and emigrating to South Australia in May 2003.

== See also ==
- Col Needham
