= Kevin Hughes (Internet pioneer) =

Kevin Hughes was one of the pioneers of the World Wide Web in the United States, while a student at Honolulu Community College (HCC), in Hawaii.

He created one of the first campus web sites, including novel (at the time) ideas such as a virtual tour of a campus museum. He also wrote software that was used in early web sites to index web pages: Simple Web Indexing System for Humans, or SWISH.

== Developments ==
Hughes later developed seminal technologies for numerous commerce web sites.

== Icon Design ==
He also designed the original public domain icons that come with the Apache HTTP Server.

== Awards ==
He is one of only six inductees in the World Wide Web Hall of Fame announced at the first international conference on the World Wide Web in 1994.
