= Stéphane Bortzmeyer =

French computer science architect

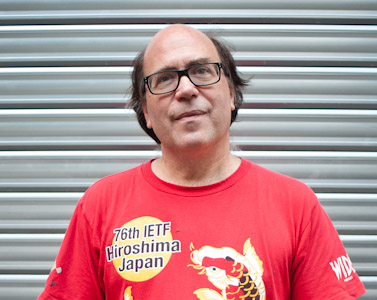
- Stéphane Bortzmeyer in 2012
- Citizenship: French
- Occupation: Engineer
- Employer: AFNIC
- Website: www.bortzmeyer.org

Stéphane Bortzmeyer is a French engineer specialised in computer networks.

== Biography ==
Stéphane Bortzmeyer is a research engineer at Association française pour le nommage Internet en coopération (Afnic). He has worked mostly on DNS security.

He is a member of Gitoyen and of the Board of France-IX, the main exchange for the Internet in France.

As a member of IETF, he authored several Request for Comments, most notably on DNS and privacy.

He contributes to the website anti-rev.org, which fights against Revisionism in France.

== Bibliography ==
- Cyberstructure. C & F Éditions. 2018. ISBN 9782915825879.

== See also ==
- Afnic
