= Retrosheet =

American non-profit organization

- Formation: 1989
- Founder: David Smith
- Type: 501(c)(3) organization
- Headquarters: Newark, Delaware, U.S.
- President: Tom Thress
- Affiliations: Society for American Baseball Research (SABR)
- Funding: Donations
- Website: retrosheet.org

Retrosheet is a 501(c)(3) nonprofit organization who provides box scores of Major League Baseball (MLB) games from 1897 to the present, and play-by-play narratives for almost every contest since 1908, through its website and data repositories. It also includes scores from all major league games played since the 1871 season (the inception of organized professional baseball), as well as every All-Star Game and postseason game, including the World Series, as well as the Negro leagues' East–West All-Star Game and World Series.

== History ==
Retrosheet informally began in 1989, through the efforts of Dr. David Smith, a biology professor at the University of Delaware, and fellow baseball enthusiasts. Building on momentum begun by writer Bill James' Project Scoresheet in 1984, Smith brought together a host of like-minded individuals to compile an accessible database of statistical information previously unavailable to the general public.

Smith originally contacted teams and sportswriters in order to gain access to their scorebooks, while other contributors researched old newspapers for play-by-play accounts. During the 1988–89 baseball off-season, through a connection with the front office of the Baltimore Orioles, Smith was able to gain access to the Orioles' scorebooks going back to the 1954 season, some 4,700 games. Marshaling the computer expertise of a number of associates, Smith used the accounts from various sources to build a wealth of new data. The result has allowed fans and historians to explore new aspects of baseball history by using pertinent information, as well as to clarify the record with new insights into daily records from each team and each game.

While all teams eventually contributed to the project, gaps occurred with some teams, most notably the Atlanta Braves, Houston Astros and Pittsburgh Pirates of the late 1960s. The Braves, Pirates and Cincinnati Reds have also been lacking information from previous eras. Only through the deduction of game play by plays from various newspapers accounts was Retrosheet able to discern what occurred during some games where no official or team record was found.

The first 40 years of the 20th century have uncovered more play-by-play coverage than the period of the 1940s. The lack of television (and prior to that, radio) accounts serve as the main reasons for this disparity, while World War II limited the space that had been used for such information.

In 1992, Retrosheet obtained copies of the detailed baseball scoresheets kept by Allan Roth, who had worked as a statistician for the Brooklyn and Los Angeles Dodgers from 1947 to 1964. Roth's records documented games pitch by pitch; from 1947 into 1951, he also noted the type and location of individual pitches. Following Roth's death in March 1992, Los Angeles baseball researcher David Stephan worked with Roth's family to organize his baseball papers and coordinate their transfer to the library of the Amateur Athletic Foundation of Los Angeles, known today as LA84. The foundation's library director, Wayne Wilson, permitted Retrosheet to copy the scoresheets, and Retrosheet volunteers David and Sherri Nichols carried out the copying of the oversized records. Retrosheet reported in October 1994 that it held approximately 2,700 Roth scoresheets, of which about 750 had been entered into its computerized database. The acquisition preserved unusually detailed historical game accounts for subsequent research.

In 1994, the organization began sending out a quarterly newsletter to interested parties, and added a website. Following publication of the January 2002 newsletter, the organization chose to end sending out the paper version, adding periodic updates via their website instead.

By 2007, Retrosheet had been cited as a source in multiple large American newspapers, including The Boston Globe, Chicago Tribune, Detroit Free Press, and Pittsburgh Post-Gazette. In 2012, Retrosheet founder Smith was the recipient of the Henry Chadwick Award from SABR, given annually to a baseball researcher.

As of 2013, Retrosheet had recovered the box scores and entered in the likely play-by-play for over 70% of all the major league games played between 1903 (the year of the first World Series) and 1984, representing over 115,000 games. In 2013, Retrosheet was able to announce the release of over a century of box scores, spanning from 1914 to 2013. Box score coverage was later extended back to 1897, with additional scores available for 1871, 1872, and 1874. As of October 2026, Retrosheet has play-by-play descriptions for all games played from 1971 onwards, with a list of "games needed" indexed by season going back to 1908. The most recent game missing a play-by-play description is the Houston Astros at Atlanta Braves game of September 27, 1970 and the most recent game missing any play fielding data is the Minnesota Twins at New York Yankees game of April 26, 1996.

Retrosheet's board of directors meets each year in conjunction with the annual convention of the Society for American Baseball Research (SABR). Since 2013, they have mostly convened pro-forma via phone to conduct formal business. Many of Retrosheet's contributors are SABR members, whose data is based mostly on the crowd-sourced volunteer-gathered information Retrosheet relies upon for its twice-a-year updates to their site.
