= Requests (software) =

Software library for HTTP connections in Python

- Original author: Kenneth Reitz
- Developers: Cory Benfield, Ian Stapleton Cordasco, Nate Prewitt
- Initial release: 14 February 2011
- Stable release: 2.32.5 / 18 August 2025; 6 months ago
- Written in: Python
- License: Apache License 2.0
- Website: requests.readthedocs.io
- Repository: github.com/psf/requests

Requests is an HTTP client library for the Python programming language.

Requests is one of the most downloaded Python libraries, with over 30 million monthly downloads. It maps the HTTP protocol onto Python's object-oriented semantics. Requests's design has inspired and been copied by HTTP client libraries for other programming languages. It is implemented as a wrapper for urllib3, another third-party Python HTTP library.

Kenneth Reitz, the original author, handed control over to the Python Software Foundation in 2019 after being diagnosed with bipolar disorder in 2015.

== Features ==
Requests supports TLS/SSL verification, cookies, compression, SOCKS, timeouts, a variety of request methods, and custom headers.
