= Frame-based terminology =

Approach to terminology

Frame-based terminology is a cognitive approach to terminology developed by Pamela Faber and colleagues at the University of Granada. One of its basic premises is that the conceptualization of any specialized domain is goal-oriented, and depends to a certain degree on the task to be accomplished. Since a major problem in modeling any domain is the fact that languages can reflect different conceptualizations and construals, texts as well as specialized knowledge resources are used to extract a set of domain concepts. Language structure is also analyzed to obtain an inventory of conceptual relations to structure these concepts.

As its name implies, frame-based terminology uses certain aspects of frame semantics to structure specialized domains and create non-language-specific representations. Such configurations are the conceptual meaning underlying specialized texts in different languages, and thus facilitate specialized knowledge acquisition.

Frame-based terminology focuses on:

1. conceptual organization;
2. the multidimensional nature of terminological units; and
3. the extraction of semantic and syntactic information through the use of multilingual corpora.

In frame-based terminology, conceptual networks are based on an underlying domain event, which generates templates for the actions and processes that take place in the specialized field as well as the entities that participate in them.

As a result, knowledge extraction is largely text-based. The terminological entries are composed of information from specialized texts as well as specialized language resources. Knowledge is configured and represented in a dynamic conceptual network that is capable of adapting to new contexts. At the most general level, generic roles of agent, patient, result, and instrument are activated by basic predicate meanings such as make, do, affect, use, become, etc. which structure the basic meanings in specialized texts. From a linguistic perspective, Aktionsart distinctions in texts are based on Van Valin's classification of predicate types. At the more specific levels of the network, the qualia structure of the generative lexicon is used as a basis for the systematic classification and relation of nominal entities.

The methodology of frame-based terminology derives the conceptual system of the domain by means of an integrated top-down and bottom-up approach. The bottom-up approach consists of extracting information from a corpus of texts in various languages, specifically related to the domain. The top-down approach includes the information provided by specialized dictionaries and other reference material, complemented by the help of experts in the field.

In a parallel way, the underlying conceptual framework of a knowledge-domain event is specified. The most generic or base-level categories of a domain are configured in a prototypical domain event or action-environment interface. This provides a template applicable to all levels of information structuring. In this way a structure is obtained which facilitates and enhances knowledge acquisition since the information in term entries is internally as well as externally coherent.
