= Robert S. Boyer =

American mathematician, computer scientist and philosopher

Robert Stephen Boyer
- Born: August 2, 1946 (age 80); Washington, D. C.
- Education: University of Texas at Austin
- Occupations: Computer scientist, mathematician
- Employers: The University of Texas at Austin; University of Edinburgh
- Known for: Boyer–Moore string-search algorithm, Nqthm, ACL2
- Spouse: Anne Olivia Herrington
- Children: Madeleine, Margaret, Nathaniel
- Scientific career
- Thesis: Locking: A Restriction of Resolution (1971)
- Doctoral advisor: Woodrow Wilson Bledsoe
- Website: https://www.cs.utexas.edu/~boyer/

Robert Stephen Boyer is an American retired professor of computer science, mathematics, and philosophy at The University of Texas at Austin. He and J Strother Moore invented the Boyer–Moore string-search algorithm, a particularly efficient string searching algorithm, in 1977. He and Moore also collaborated on the Boyer–Moore automated theorem prover, Nqthm, in 1992. Following this, he worked with Moore and Matt Kaufmann on another theorem prover called ACL2. He was elected AAAI Fellow in 1991.

== Publications ==
Boyer has published extensively, including the following books:

- A Computational Logic Handbook, with J S. Moore. Second Edition. Academic Press, London, 1998.
- Automated Reasoning: Essays in Honor of Woody Bledsoe, editor. Kluwer Academic, Dordrecht, The Netherlands, 1991.
- A Computational Logic Handbook, with J S. Moore. Academic Press, New York, 1988.
- The Correctness Problem in Computer Science, editor, with J S. Moore. Academic Press, London, 1981.
- A Computational Logic, with J S. Moore. Academic Press, New York, 1979.

== See also ==
- Boyer–Moore majority vote algorithm
- QED manifesto
