= Richard R. Burton =

American computer scientist

Richard R. Burton is an American computer scientist at Acuitus, who previously worked at Bolt Beranek and Newman, and Xerox PARC. A charter Fellow of the ACM, he was awarded their Software System Award in 1994 for his contributions to Interlisp.
