= French Fifth Republic =

Government of France since 1958

French Republic République française
- 1958–present
- Flag
- Motto: "Liberté, Égalité, Fraternité" "Liberty, Equality, Fraternity"
- Anthem: "La Marseillaise"
- Location of France (dark green) in the European Union (green)
- Capital and largest city: Paris; 48°51.4′N 2°21.05′E
- Official language: French (Note: For information about regional languages see Languages of France.)
- Religion: Secular state (Note: Excluding Alsace-Moselle) In Alsace-Moselle: Roman Catholicism; Calvinism; Lutheranism; Judaism
- Demonym: French
- Government: Unitary semi-presidential constitutional republic
- President
  - 1959–1969 (first): Charles de Gaulle (Note: René Coty, the last president of the Fourth Republic, served briefly in a transitional capacity between the promulgation of the new Constitution and the election of de Gaulle as the "proper" first president of the Fifth Republic. De Gaulle served as the last prime minister of the Fourth Republic and continued to serve as such during Coty's transitional presidency; upon becoming president, he appointed Debré in his place as prime minister.)
  - 2017–present (current): Emmanuel Macron
- Prime Minister
  - 1959–1962 (first): Michel Debré
  - Sep 2025–present (current): Sébastien Lecornu
- Legislature: Parliament
  - Upper house: Senate
  - Lower house: National Assembly

Establishment
  - Current constitution: 4 October 1958 (68 years)
  - Independence of Algeria: 5 July 1962
  - Direct presidential elections: 28 October 1962
  - Decision on Freedom of Association: 16 July 1971
  - First cohabitation: 20 March 1986
  - Presidential term reduced to five years: 24 September 2000
  - 2008 institutional reform: 23 July 2008

Area
  - Total: 643,801 km^{2} (248,573 sq mi) (42nd)
- GDP (PPP): 2026 estimate
  - Total: $4.74 trillion
- HDI (2026): 0.920 very high
- Currency: Euro (EUR); CFP franc (XPF); (French Polynesia, New Caledonia, and Wallis and Futuna)
- Date format: dd/mm/yyyy (AD)
- Calling code: +33 (Note: The overseas regions and collectivities form part of the French telephone numbering plan, but have their own country calling codes: Guadeloupe +590; Martinique +596; French Guiana +594, Réunion and Mayotte +262; Saint Pierre and Miquelon +508. The overseas territories are not part of the French telephone-numbering plan; their country calling codes are: New Caledonia +687, French Polynesia +689; Wallis and Futuna +681.)
- ISO 3166 code: FR
- Internet TLD: .fr (Note: In addition to .fr, several other Internet TLDs are used in French overseas départements and territories: .re, .mq, .gp, .tf, .nc, .pf, .wf, .pm, .gf and .yt. France also uses .eu, shared with other members of the European Union. The .cat domain is used in Catalan-speaking territories.)
Preceded by
French Fourth Republic

The French Fifth Republic (French: Cinquième République Française) is France's current republican system of government. It was established on 4 October 1958 by Charles de Gaulle under the Constitution of the Fifth Republic.

The Fifth Republic emerged from the collapse of the Fourth Republic, replacing the former parliamentary republic with a semi-presidential (or dual-executive) system that split powers between a president as head of state and a prime minister as head of government. De Gaulle, who was the first French president elected under the Fifth Republic in December 1958, favored the concept of a powerful head of state, whom he envisaged as embodying l'esprit de la nation ("the spirit of the nation"). Under the Fifth Republic, the president has the right to dissolve the National Assembly and hold new parliamentary elections. If the president' supporters have a majority in the national assembly, the president sets domestic policy and the prime minister puts it into practice. During a presidential mandate, the president can also change prime ministers and reshuffle the government. If there is a politically opposed majority in the national assembly, the president must nominate a prime minister from outside his/her support base, resulting in cohabitation. In the beginning of the Fifth Republic, presidential elections took place every seventh year and parliamentary elections every fifth year. After 2002 the presidential elections (in April) and parliamentary elections (in June) were synchronized to be held every fifth year; this pattern persisted until the snap election for the legislature in 2024.

The Fifth Republic has lasted longer than all but two former political régimes in France: the hereditary, feudal monarchy of the medieval and early-modern ancien régime, and the parliamentary Third Republic (4 September 1870 to 10 July 1940).

== Origins ==
=== Instability of the Fourth Republic ===
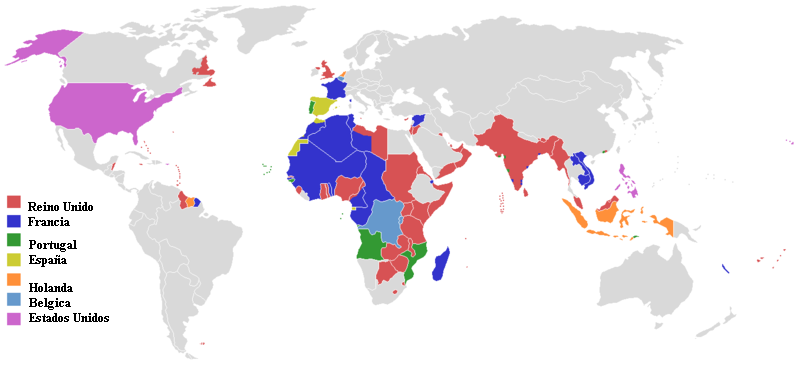
France and its colonial empire circa 1945 (shown in blue)

The Fourth Republic had suffered from a lack of political consensus, a weak executive, and governments forming and falling in quick succession since 1946. With no party or coalition able to sustain a parliamentary majority, prime ministers found themselves unable to risk their political position with unpopular reforms.

=== May 1958 crisis ===
The trigger for the collapse of the French Fourth Republic was the Algiers crisis of 1958. France was still a colonial power, although conflict and revolt had begun the process of decolonization. French West Africa, French Indochina, and French Algeria still sent representatives to the French parliament under systems of limited suffrage in the French Union. Algeria in particular, despite being the colony with the largest French population, saw rising pressure for separation from Metropolitan France. The situation was complicated by those in Algeria, such as European settlers, native Jews, and Harkis (native Muslims who were loyal to France), who wanted to maintain the union with France. The Algerian War was not just a separatist movement but had elements of a civil war.

Further complications came when a section of the French Army rebelled and openly backed the Algérie française movement to defeat separation. Charles de Gaulle, who had retired from politics a decade before, placed himself in the midst of the crisis, calling on the nation to suspend the government and create a new constitutional system. The parliament was unable to choose a government amid popular protest, and De Gaulle was carried to power when the last parliament of the Fourth Republic voted for its own dissolution and the convening of a constitutional convention.

=== Transitional period ===
De Gaulle and his supporters proposed a system of strong presidents elected for seven-year terms. The president, under the proposed constitution, would have executive powers to run the country in consultation with a prime minister whom he would appoint. On 1 June 1958, Charles de Gaulle was appointed head of the government; on 3 June 1958, a constitutional law empowered the new government to draft a new constitution of France, and another law granted Charles de Gaulle and his cabinet the power to rule by decree for up to six months, except on matters of criminal law, electoral law, matters related to the basic rights and freedoms of citizens, and the activities of trade unions. These plans were approved by more than 80% of those who voted in the referendum of 28 September 1958. The new constitution was signed into law on 4 October 1958. Since each new constitution established a new republic, France moved from the Fourth to the Fifth Republic.

=== 1958 constitution ===
The new constitution contained transitional clauses (articles 90–92) extending the period of rule by decree until the new institutions were operating. René Coty remained president of the Republic until the new president was proclaimed. On 21 December 1958, Charles de Gaulle was elected president of France by an electoral college. The provisional constitutional commission, acting in lieu of the constitutional council, proclaimed the results of the election on 9 January 1959. The new president began his office on that date, appointing Michel Debré as prime minister.

The 1958 constitution also replaced the French Union with the French Community, which allowed fourteen member territories (excluding Algeria) to assert their independence. 1960 became known as the "Year of Africa" because of this wave of newly independent states. Algeria became independent on 5 July 1962.

== Evolution ==
=== Election of the president ===
The president initially was elected by an electoral college but in 1962 de Gaulle proposed that the president be directly elected by the citizens and held a referendum on the change. Although the method and intent of de Gaulle in that referendum were contested by most political groups except for the Gaullists, the change was approved by the French electorate. The Constitutional Council declined to rule on the constitutionality of the referendum.

The president is now elected every five years, changed from seven by a constitutional referendum in 2000, to reduce the probability of cohabitation due to former differences in the length of terms for the National Assembly and presidency. The president is elected in one or two rounds of voting: if one candidate gets a majority of votes in the first round that person is president-elect; if no one gets a majority in the first round, the two candidates with the greatest number of votes go to a second round.

=== Separation of powers ===
Two major changes occurred in the 1970s regarding constitutional checks and balances. Traditionally, France operated according to parliamentary supremacy: no authority was empowered to rule on whether statutes passed by Parliament respected the constitutional rights of the citizens. In 1971, however, the Constitutional Council, arguing that the preamble of the constitution referenced the rights defined in the 1789 Declaration of the Rights of Man and of the Citizen and the preamble of the 1946 constitution, concluded that statutes must respect these rights and so declared partially unconstitutional a statute because it violated freedom of association.

Only the President of the Republic, the Prime Minister, or the president of either house of Parliament could ask for a constitutional review before a statute was signed into law—which greatly reduces the likelihood of such a review if all these officeholders happened to be from the same side of politics, which was the case at the time. Then in 1974, a constitutional amendment widened this prerogative to 60 members of the National Assembly or 60 members of the senate. From that date, the opposition has been able to have controversial new statutes examined for constitutionality.

== Presidents of the Fifth Republic ==
Socialist (PS) Centrist (CD) Centrist (RE) Republican (UDF) Gaullist (UDR; RPR) Neo-Gaullist (UMP)

No.	President	Lived	from	to	Party
1	Charles de Gaulle	1890–1970	8 January 1959	28 April 1969 (resigned)	Independent
–	Alain Poher	1909–1996	28 April 1969	15 June 1969 (interim)	CD
2	Georges Pompidou	1911–1974	15 June 1969	2 April 1974 (died in office)	UDR
–	Alain Poher	1909–1996	2 April 1974	19 May 1974 (interim)	CD
3	Valéry Giscard d'Estaing	1926–2020	19 May 1974	21 May 1981	UDF
4	François Mitterrand	1916–1996	21 May 1981	17 May 1995	Socialist
5	Jacques Chirac	1932–2019	17 May 1995	16 May 2007	RPR then UMP
6	Nicolas Sarkozy	b. 1955	16 May 2007	15 May 2012	UMP
7	François Hollande	b. 1954	15 May 2012	14 May 2017	Socialist
8	Emmanuel Macron	b. 1977	14 May 2017	Incumbent	RE

Source: "Les présidents de la République depuis 1848" [Presidents of the Republic Since 1848] (in French). Présidence de la République française.

== President image gallery ==
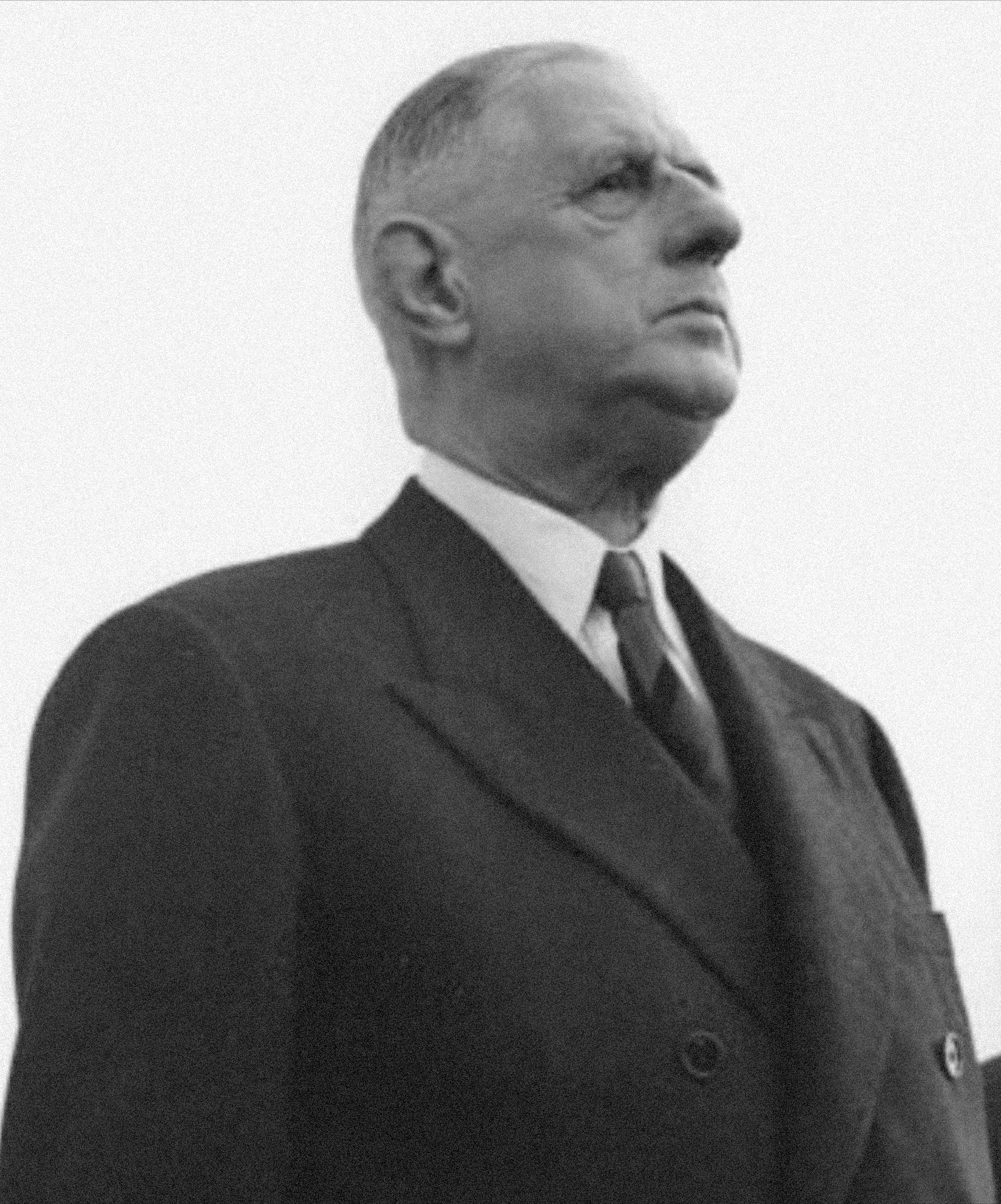
Charles de Gaulle
(1890–1970)
Served 1959–1969

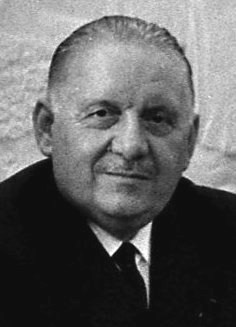
Alain Poher
(1909–1996)
Served 1969, 1974 (as interim)

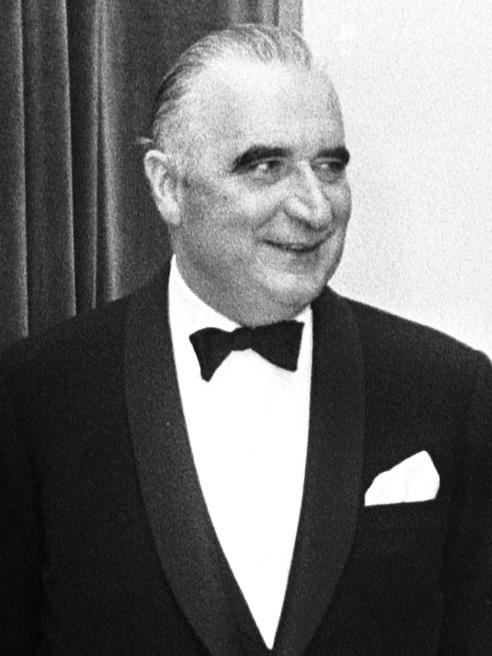
Georges Pompidou
(1911–1974)
Served 1969–1974

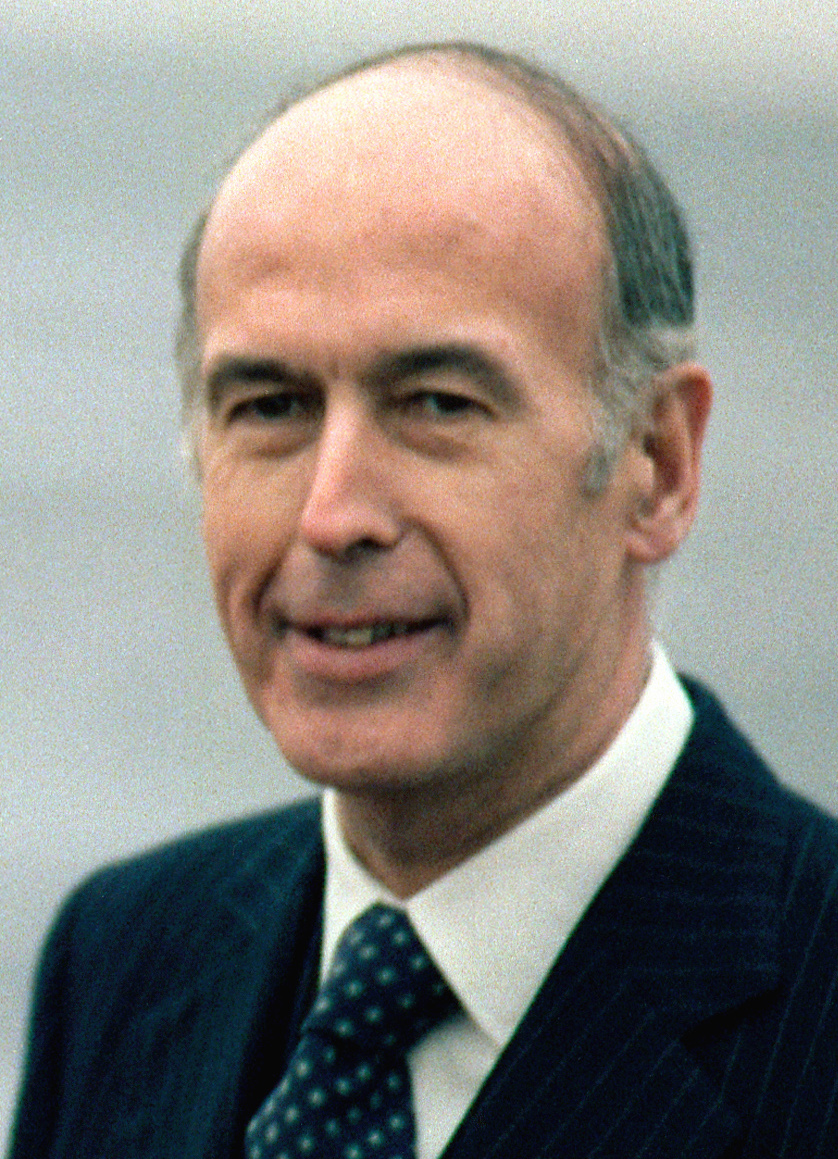
Valéry Giscard d'Estaing
(1926–2020)
Served 1974–1981

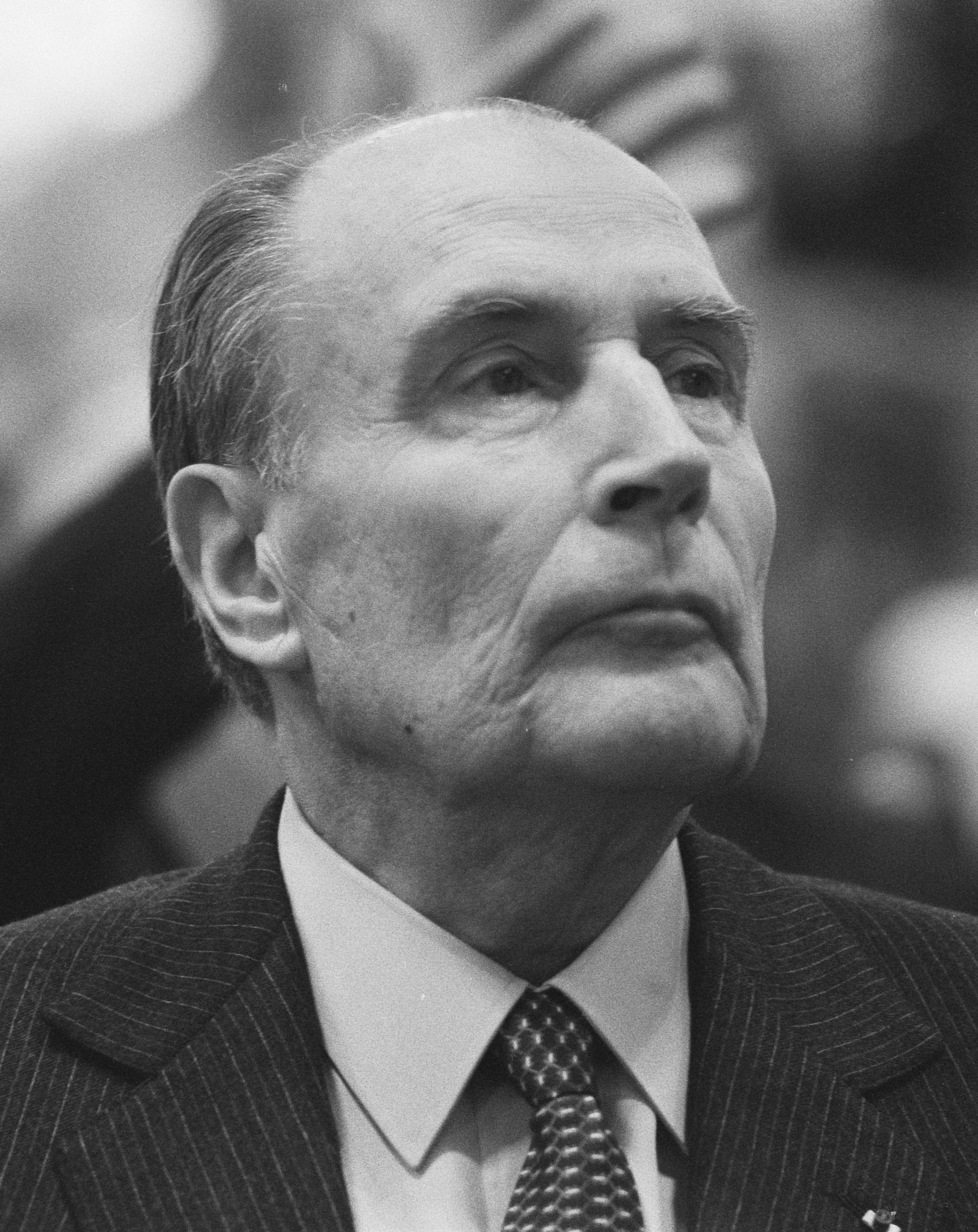
François Mitterrand
(1916–1996)
Served 1981–1995

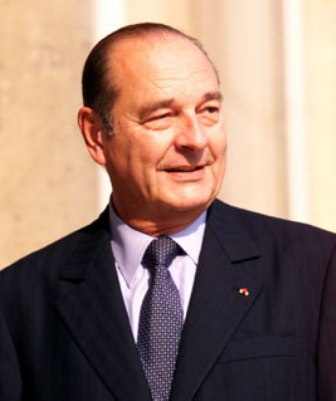
Jacques Chirac
(1932–2019)
Served 1995–2007

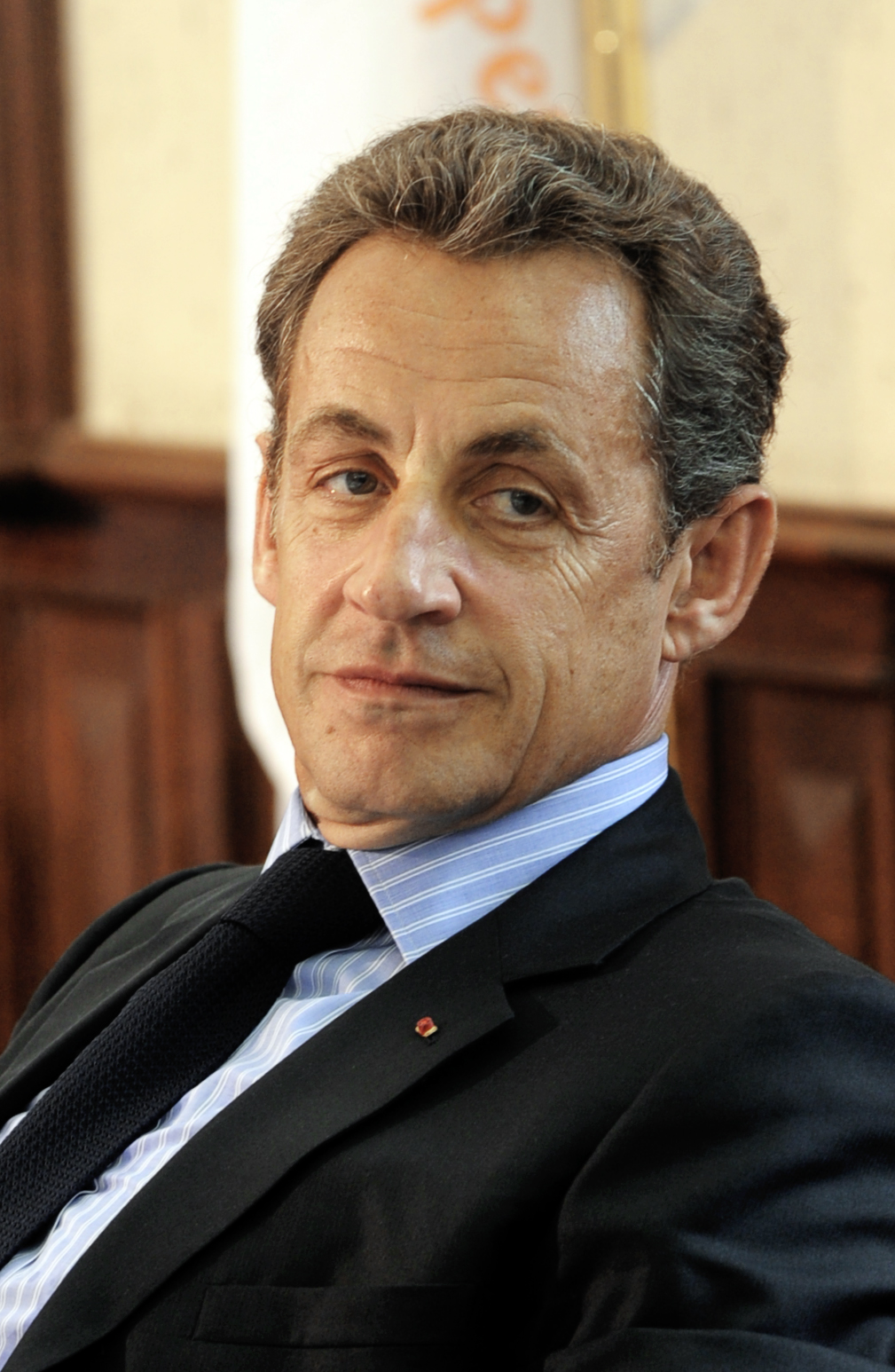
Nicolas Sarkozy
(b. 1955)
Served 2007–2012

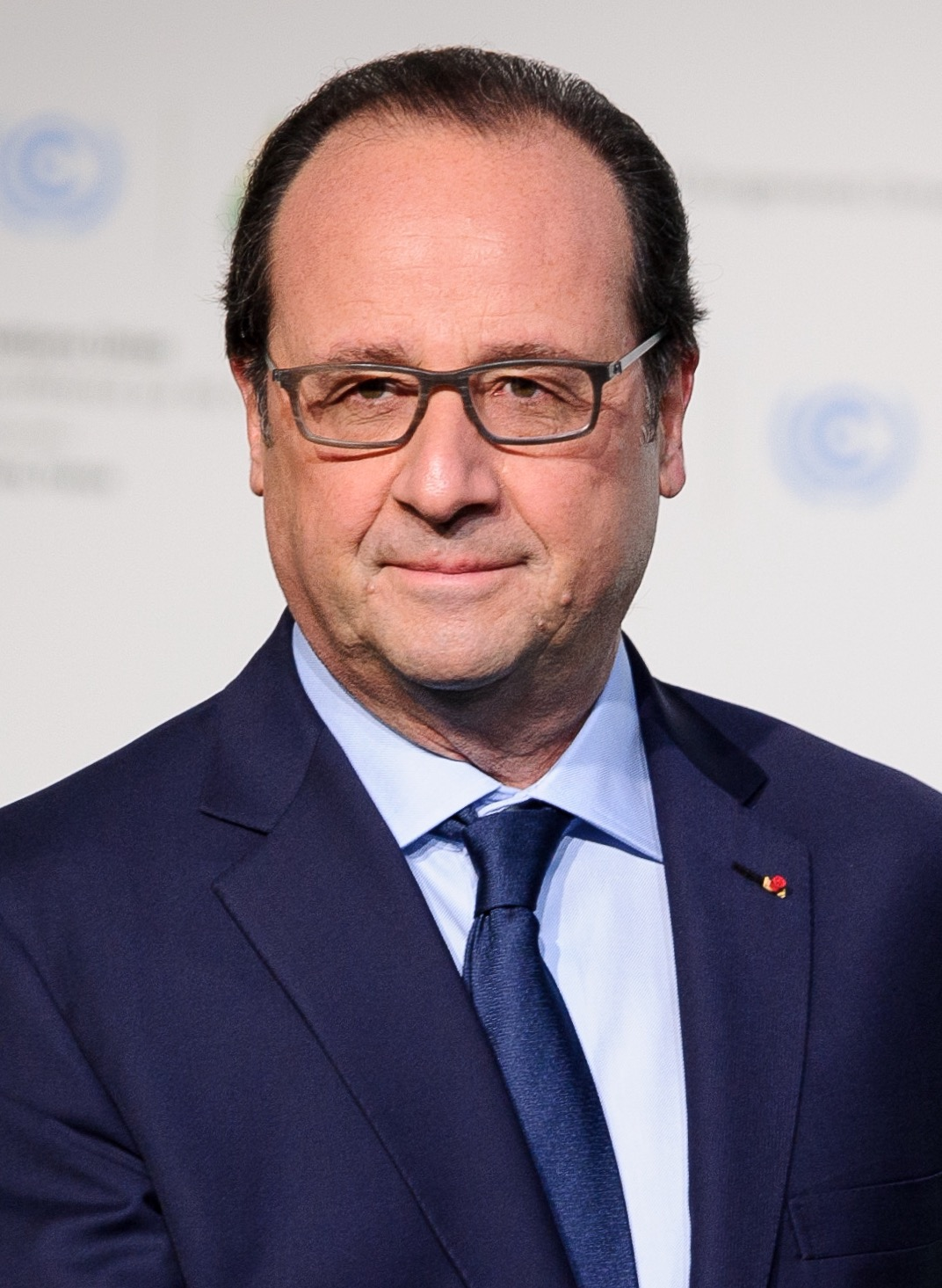
François Hollande
(b. 1954)
Served 2012–2017

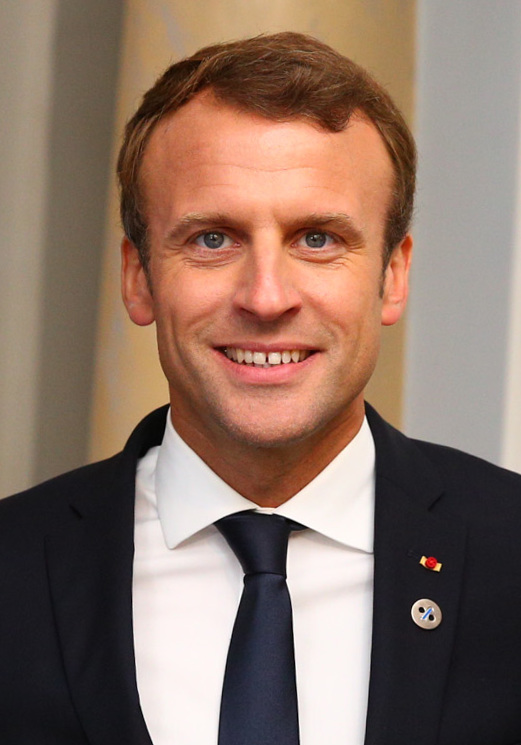
Emmanuel Macron
(b. 1977)
Incumbent since May 2017

== Prime Ministers of the Fifth Republic ==
Socialist (PS)
Centrist (RE)
Republican (UDF)
Gaullist (UNR; UDR; RPR)
Neo-Gaullist (UMP; LR)

Name	Term start	Term end	Political party	President
Michel Debré	8 January 1959	14 April 1962	UNR	Charles de Gaulle (1959–1969)
Georges Pompidou	14 April 1962	10 July 1968	UNR then UDR	Charles de Gaulle (1959–1969)
Maurice Couve de Murville	10 July 1968	20 June 1969	UDR	Charles de Gaulle (1959–1969)
Jacques Chaban-Delmas	20 June 1969	6 July 1972	UDR	Georges Pompidou (1969–1974)
Pierre Messmer	6 July 1972	27 May 1974	UDR	Georges Pompidou (1969–1974)
Jacques Chirac (1st term)	27 May 1974	26 August 1976	UDR	Valéry Giscard d'Estaing (1974–1981)
Raymond Barre	26 August 1976	21 May 1981	Independent	Valéry Giscard d'Estaing (1974–1981)
Pierre Mauroy	21 May 1981	17 July 1984	Socialist	François Mitterrand (1981–1995)
Laurent Fabius	17 July 1984	20 March 1986	Socialist	François Mitterrand (1981–1995)
Jacques Chirac (2nd term)	20 March 1986	10 May 1988	RPR	François Mitterrand (1981–1995)
Michel Rocard	10 May 1988	15 May 1991	Socialist	François Mitterrand (1981–1995)
Édith Cresson	15 May 1991	2 April 1992	Socialist	François Mitterrand (1981–1995)
Pierre Bérégovoy	2 April 1992	29 March 1993	Socialist	François Mitterrand (1981–1995)
Édouard Balladur	29 March 1993	18 May 1995	RPR	François Mitterrand (1981–1995)
Alain Juppé	18 May 1995	3 June 1997	RPR	Jacques Chirac (1995–2007)
Lionel Jospin	3 June 1997	6 May 2002	Socialist	Jacques Chirac (1995–2007)
Jean-Pierre Raffarin	6 May 2002	31 May 2005	UMP	Jacques Chirac (1995–2007)
Dominique de Villepin	31 May 2005	17 May 2007	UMP	Jacques Chirac (1995–2007)
François Fillon	17 May 2007	15 May 2012	UMP	Nicolas Sarkozy (2007–2012)
Jean-Marc Ayrault	15 May 2012	31 March 2014	Socialist	François Hollande (2012–2017)
Manuel Valls	31 March 2014	6 December 2016	Socialist	François Hollande (2012–2017)
Bernard Cazeneuve	6 December 2016	10 May 2017	Socialist	François Hollande (2012–2017)
Édouard Philippe	15 May 2017	3 July 2020	LR then Independent	Emmanuel Macron (since 2017)
Jean Castex	3 July 2020	16 May 2022	RE	Emmanuel Macron (since 2017)
Élisabeth Borne	16 May 2022	9 January 2024	RE	Emmanuel Macron (since 2017)
Gabriel Attal	9 January 2024	5 September 2024	RE	Emmanuel Macron (since 2017)
Michel Barnier	5 September 2024	13 December 2024	LR	Emmanuel Macron (since 2017)
François Bayrou	13 December 2024	9 September 2025	MoDem	Emmanuel Macron (since 2017)
Sébastien Lecornu	9 September 2025	Incumbent	RE	Emmanuel Macron (since 2017)

Source: "Former Prime Ministers of the Fifth Republic". Government of France.

== Institutions of the Fifth Republic ==
Institutions of the Fifth Republic

== See also ==
- 1958 Guinean constitutional referendum
- French colonial empire
- List of French possessions and colonies
- Politics of France
- Republican Front (French Fifth Republic)
- Proposed French Sixth Republic
