= Association française pour le nommage Internet en coopération =

French non-profit top-level domain operator

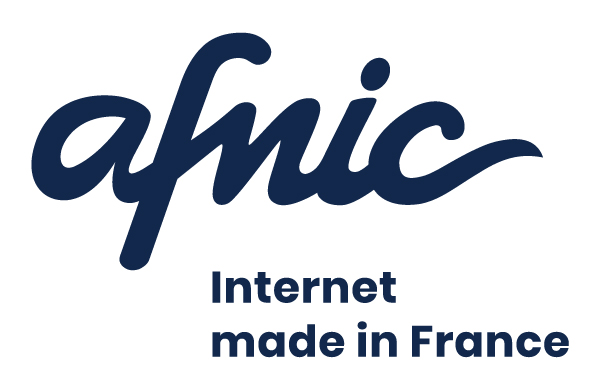

- AFNIC headquarters
- Type: Non-profit organization
- Industry: Internet, Communications
- Founded: 4 December 1997
- Headquarters: Guyancourt, Saint-Quentin-en-Yvelines, France
- Website: www.afnic.fr

Association française pour le nommage Internet en coopération (lit. 'French Association for Cooperative Internet Naming', AFNIC) is a non-profit corporation that was created in December 1997 in order to operate country code top-level domain names for France and a number of its overseas departments and collectivities. These include:

- .fr (for France),
- .re (for Réunion Island),
- .yt (for Mayotte),
- .tf (for French Southern and Antarctic Lands),
- .pm (for Saint-Pierre-et-Miquelon)
- .wf (for Wallis-et-Futuna).

As of today, AFNIC is ruled under Decree 2007-162 of 6 February 2007. AFNIC is currently headquartered in the commune of Guyancourt in Saint-Quentin-en-Yvelines, France.

== Members ==
AFNIC includes public and private Internet players: users (legal entities and individuals), domain name registrars (Internet service providers), international entities and public authoritative representatives.

== Missions ==
AFNIC manages a general interest service. Therefore, it is at the crossroads of operators, Internet Service Providers, Internet users, public authorities as well as other national and international parties.

This privileged position and responsibility leads AFNIC to participate in the evolution of Internet governance and management. Thus, AFNIC is largely involved in the international relations chorus.

Through its missions, the international actions of AFNIC are focused on three main directions:

- To contribute and participate to the global Internet governance and management (WSIS, ICANN, CENTR...)
- To introduce new standards and services (IETF, RIPE NCC)
- To transfer its knowledge and know-how (International College)

Over the past few years, the number of international meetings in which the domain name registries are involved is constantly increasing. This strong international activity demonstrates that domain name registries have a key role to play in the information society globalisation process.

90% of the profits generated by .fr domain names are donated to the Afnic Foundation for digital solidarity.

== Top-level domains (TLD) managed by AFNIC ==
=== French country-code top-level domains (ccTLD) ===
- .fr: for France, the French Republic
- .re: for the island of Réunion
- .tf: for the French Southern and Antarctic Lands
- .wf: for the islands of Wallis and Futuna
- .pm: for the islands of Saint Pierre and Miquelon
- .yt: for the island of Mayotte

=== Other top-level domains run by AFNIC ===
- .alsace: for Alsace
- .bzh: for Bretagne
- .paris: for the city of Paris
- .aquarelle: for the société Aquarelle
- .ovh: for the French Internet Service Provider OVH
- .corsica: for Region Corsica Puntu Corsica
- .museum : for the International Council of Museums (ICOM);
- .bostik : for the company Bostik;
- .lancaster : for the brand Lancaster;
- .leclerc : for the brand E.Leclerc;
- .mma : for the insurance company MMA;
- .sncf : for the railroad company SNCF;
- .total : for the energy company Total.

== French top-level domains not managed by AFNIC ==
- .nc : for New Caledonia;
- .mq : for Martinique;
- .gp : for Guadeloupe;
- .gf : for French Guiana;
- .pf : for French Polynesia.
