= .tf =

Internet country code top-level domain for the French Southern and Antarctic Lands

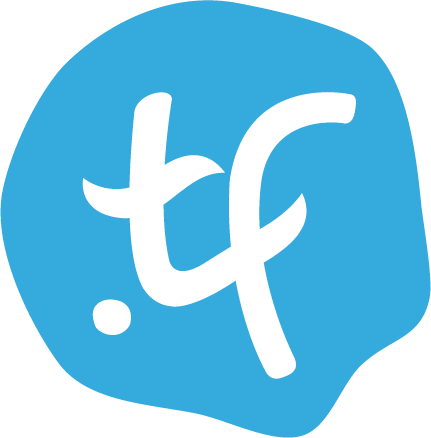
- Introduced: 26 August 1997
- TLD type: Country code top-level domain
- Status: Active
- Registry: AFNIC
- Sponsor: AFNIC
- Intended use: Entities connected with the French Southern and Antarctic Lands
- Registration restrictions: Registrant must be based in a European Union member state, Iceland, Liechtenstein, Norway, Switzerland
- Structure: Registrations are made at second level
- Documents: ICANN redelegation resolution
- DNSSEC: Yes
- Registry website: nic.tf

.tf is the Internet country code top-level domain (ccTLD) for the French Southern and Antarctic Lands. Along with .fr, .pm, .re, .wf and .yt it is administered by AFNIC. Before 23 October 2004, Adamsnames, based in Cambridge in the United Kingdom, administered this TLD.

The French Southern and Antarctic Lands are territories either recognised as French or claimed by France but suspended under the Antarctic Treaty System, and the domain name derives from the French, Terres australes et antarctiques françaises. Part of the French claim includes a section of the continent of Antarctica, creating an overlap between .tf and the general Antarctica domain .aq.

== See also ==
- Internet in France
- ISO 3166-2:TF
- .aq –ccTLD for Antarctica
- .eu –ccTLD for the European Union
- .fr –ccTLD for France
