= Olean =

Olean may refer to:

- Olean, Indiana
- Olean, Missouri
- Olean, New York, the largest city named Olean
  - Olean (town), New York, a surrounding municipality
- Olestra, an artificial fat substitute

== See also ==
- Oleane, a defunct French internet service provider
