= Aussie Broadband =

Australian Internet service provider

Aussie Broadband Limited
- Company type: Public company
- Traded as: ASX: ABB
- Industry: Telecommunications
- Predecessor: Westvic Broadband; Wideband Networks
- Founded: 2008
- Founder: Phillip Britt; John Reisinger
- Headquarters: Morwell, Australia
- Area served: Australia
- Products: NBN; VoIP; Fetch TV; Mobile broadband; Mobile phone
- Services: Internet service provider; Mobile telephony
- Number of employees: 1,300 (2024)
- Website: www.aussiebroadband.com.au

Aussie Broadband is an Australian telecommunications and internet retail service provider. It was formed in 2008 after the amalgamation of Wideband Networks and Westvic Broadband.

Aussie Broadband is the fourth largest retail internet service provider in Australia. Aussie Broadband’s market share of NBN services sits at 8.9%, with the company totalling 780,259 broadband connections as of June 2024.

The company was established in Morwell in Victoria's Gippsland region. The company also has offices in Victoria (Dandenong South and Melbourne CBD), Sydney, Brisbane, Perth, Adelaide and remote staff scattered across Australia. Their customer service centres are based wholly in Australia, and they are one of the largest employers in the Latrobe Valley region.

Aussie Broadband operates their own fibre network that spans 1,721 kilometres in length. The Optus mobile network is used for the company’s mobile services. Aside from residential and business services, Aussie offers enterprise and government solutions, with over 12,886 enterprise and government services as of July 2024.

== History ==
Aussie Broadband was formed with the amalgamation of Wideband Networks and Westvic Broadband, both of which had been trading since 2003. Wideband Networks was formed by now managing director Phillip Britt and former Chief Technical Officer John Reisinger. Both Britt and Reisinger recognised the need for more broadband availability in rural Australia, and created the company from the living room of Britt’s childhood home in Morwell, Victoria.

After the merger, Aussie Broadband focused on providing services to regional areas, such as Gippsland, Western Victoria, South Australia and the Northern Territory.

In 2010, Aussie Broadband sold its satellite customer base to SkyMesh, the largest sale of a satellite customer base in Australia.

Aussie Broadband started providing NBN services as of 2017, ceasing third party reseller agreements. Group Managing Director Phil Britt declared that, to his knowledge, the company was the only internet service provider outside the “big four” (Telstra, Optus, TPG Telecom, and Vocus Group) to do this.

In October 2018, Fetch and Aussie Broadband announced a partnership.

In 2019, Aussie Broadband upgraded its national and international networks to provide capacity for 500,000 customers with direct peering in Los Angeles, San Jose, and Singapore, as well as buying capacity on multiple international fibre optic cables.

In September 2019 it was announced work had commenced to prepare the company for going public, and in September 2020 managing director Phil Britt formally announced the company would be launching an initial public offering and listing on the Australian Securities Exchange. The public offer was extended to customers of the company, and current employees were eligible to be gifted a small package of shares. The company began trading on the market at 11 am on 16 October 2020 under the ticker ABB.

In February 2021, Aussie signed a deal with Optus Wholesale to use their 4G and 5G mobile networks, with their previous partnership with Telstra only allowing access to their 3G and 4G networks.

In March 2022, Aussie Broadband acquired Brisbane-based IT company Over the Wire for $344 million. Over the Wire provides voice networks, security services and cloud-based management systems for businesses. The acquisition also meant the company was able to operate a Tier-1 voice network.

Late 2021 saw the company introduce its own internally constructed software, named “The Fault Detector project”. The software is designed to detect faults and troubleshoot customer connections.

Aussie Broadband bought the NBN customer base (15,000 subscribers) of Uniti Group in May 2023. In November 2023, Aussie Broadband acquired Symbio for $262 million, expanding its wholesale business. In February 2024, Symbio shareholders voted in favour of the deal, with the scheme arrangement being completed on 28 February.

In February 2024, Aussie Broadband announced the creation of the Aussie Broadband Group. The announcement will see the Aussie Broadband and Symbio businesses continue to operate separately from one another under the Group umbrella. As part of the announcement, several leadership changes followed, with key ones including: Managing Director Phillip Britt was named Group Managing Director; former CFO Brian Maher was appointed CEO of Aussie Broadband; former Executive Director Michael Omeros was appointed CEO of Symbio.

In July 2024, the company launched a budget brand called Buddy Telco. In August the following year, Buddy Telco was sold to Tangerine Telecom for $8 million. At the same time, Aussie Broadband signed a six-year agreement to provide wholesale network service to Tangerine and sister company More.

In February 2026, Aussie announced it would acquire AGL Telco, the telecommunications business of AGL Energy, for $115 million in shares plus up to $10 million in shares based on growth targets. In early 2026, Aussie Broadband also acquired Nexgen and sold its Digital Sense business.

In March 2026, Phillip Britt exited the Aussie Broadband board.

== Awards ==
In 2019, managing director Phillip Britt was recognised by CommsDay for his contributions to the Australian telecommunications industry by being inducted into the Edison Awards Hall of Fame.

In April 2024, Aussie Broadband won the Roy Morgan Internet Service Provider of the Year for the third time, as well as the Mobile Service Provider of the Year, and the ‘Best of the Best’ Customer Satisfaction award.
