= Lee Thornton =

American journalist (1941–2013)

- Born: November 14, 1941
- Died: September 25, 2013 (aged 71); Bethesda, Maryland, U.S.
- Education: District of Columbia Teachers College (BA), Michigan State (MA), and Northwestern University (PhD)
- Occupations: Journalist and professor
- Years active: CBS correspondent (1974-1981), NPR host for "All Things Considered" (1982-1992), CNN correspondent (1983-1997), and professor at the University of Maryland for the Phillip Merrill College of Journalism (1997-2013)
- Employer(s): CBS, NPR, CNN, and the University of Maryland
- Known for: First African-American woman to cover the White House
- Mother: Betty Thornton
- Awards: NABJ Hall of Fame Honoree, 2013

Lee Thornton (November 14, 1941 – September 25, 2013) was an American journalist and correspondent for CBS, CNN, NPR, and professor at Howard University and the University of Maryland. She was also the first African American woman to cover the White House. She was inducted into the National Association of Black Journalists Hall of Fame in 2013.

== Personal ==
Lee Thornton was born on November 14, 1941, in Leesburg, Virginia. She graduated from Roosevelt High School in 1959 and from the former District of Columbia Teachers College. In 1968, she graduated with a master's degree in rhetoric and public address from Michigan State University and earned a doctorate at Northwestern University in 1973. She died on September 25, 2013, due to pancreatic cancer.

== Career ==
Lee Thornton started working for CBS in 1974. In 1977, CBS promoted her to report on President Jimmy Carter's Administration and she became the first African American woman to cover the White House. Afterward, she was at a CBS affiliate in Detroit before joining National Public Radio's "All Things Considered" news program as a weekend host in 1982. After hosting NPR news program, she went to Howard University to be a professor of broadcast journalism.

After a brief time at Howard, she went to the University of Maryland, College Park to teach at the Phillip Merrill College of Journalism in 1997. She was the interim dean of the College of Journalism in 2008 and 2009 and retired in 2011. In 2008, Lee Thornton was the first Eaton Broadcast Chair and served as an interim dean, which made her the second African American Woman to be a dean. She was a dean until 2009 and in 2010 she left teaching to serve as the University's Interim Associate Provost for Equity and Diversity.

== Notable works of journalism ==
Lee Thornton was posthumously inducted into the NABJ Hall of fame on January 16, 2014. She was recognized as the first African-American woman to cover the White House for a main TV network called CBS News in 1974. In 1982, For NPR's "All Things Considered", she was the first black host for the radio program. In 1997, Lee Thornton joined Phillip Merrill College of Journalism at the University of Maryland, College Park. She produced several programs but one in particular was the "Front and Center" program.

== Context ==
Lee Thornton was also known for how she taught students journalism at Howard University and the University of Maryland. At the University of Maryland, College Park, she was able to produce multiple shows on the University's channel UMTV. One show in particular that she helped start was called "Front and Center". "Front and Center" was an award-winning series that showed interviews of fellow journalists. This particular show was on the University's channel and was also on national television. The show was also covered internationally on WorldNet.

== Impact ==
She was known as the first African American Woman to cover the White House for CBS News and one of the women, along with Helen Thomas who "broke barriers" for all women in the White House. An example of careers influenced by Thornton are Robin Roberts, the first black woman to be an anchor on ESPN, Athena Jones of CNN, who as an African American woman covered the Donald Trump administration, and Soledad O'Brien, a Latina reporter who covered the White House and national.

== Awards ==
- NABJ Hall of Fame (2013)

Lee Thornton was awarded for both her teaching and contributions to journalism. She was posthumously inducted into the National Association of Black Journalists Hall of Fame in 2013. In 2011, she was named the University of Maryland's "Outstanding Woman of the Year."

In addition, a scholarship in her name was established in 2017 by Radio Television Digital News Association.

== See also ==
- National Association of Black Journalists Hall of Fame
