= Dado (painter) =

French painter

Miodrag Đurić
- Миодраг Ђурић
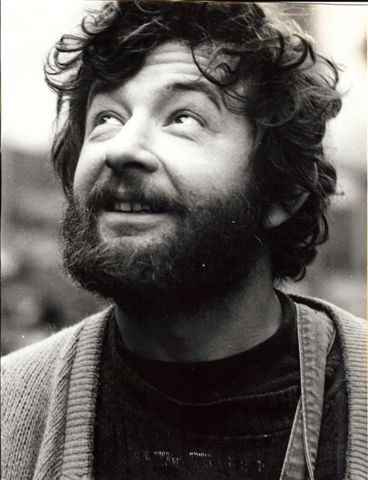
- Miodrag Đurić (Dado) in the early 1970s
- Born: Miodrag Đurić; 4 October 1933; Cetinje, Kingdom of Yugoslavia (now Montenegro)
- Died: 27 November 2010 (aged 77); Pontoise, France
- Other name: Dado
- Occupations: Painter, engraver, sculptor
- Spouse: Hessie
- Children: 5
- Website: https://www.dado.virtual.anti.museum

Miodrag Đurić (Serbian: Миодраг Ђурић; 4 October 1933 – 27 November 2010), known as Dado (Serbian: Дадо), was a Montenegrin-born artist who spent most of his life and creative career in France. He is particularly known as a painter but was also active as an engraver, draftsman, book illustrator and sculptor.

== Early life and education (1933–1955) ==
Đurić was born on 4 October 1933, in Cetinje, the historic capital of Montenegro, then part of the Kingdom of Yugoslavia, and grew up in a middle-class family. His mother, Vjera Đurić (née Kujačić), was a biology teacher, and his father, Ranko Đurić, belonged to a family of entrepreneurs.

His childhood years were affected by world events and by personal tragedies. During World War II, Yugoslavia endured Italian and German occupation, while the local Partisans initiated a resistance that led to the emergence of Tito's Yugoslavia.

At the age of 11, Đurić lost his mother in a country still coping with the wounds of war. He then temporarily moved to Slovenia to be put up by a maternal uncle. Although uninterested in general education, Đurić developed a strong interest in art and displayed early creative skills. His family supported him to develop his talent and he started studying fine arts in the maritime town of Herceg Novi between 1947 and 1951.

From 1951, Đurić moved to Serbia to carry on his education in the fine arts school of Belgrade.

== Arrival in France and first exhibitions in Paris (1956–1961) ==
Encouraged by one of his teachers in Belgrade, Đurić moved to Paris, France, in 1956 in the hope to work there as an artist. He survived thanks to small jobs and eventually was hired in a lithography workshop run by Gérard Patrice. In the meantime and through his professional environment, he learned French fast enough to be able to meet and interact with well-established artists such as Kalinowski and Jean Dubuffet. These meetings and his showing some of his drawings and paintings raised the curiosity of artists and art dealers alike.

Art dealer and former resistant Daniel Cordier discovered the young Đurić and offered him the unique opportunity to show his work in his art gallery in 1958: Dado's professional career was launched. Dado quickly moved from Paris to the countryside of Vexin. In 1960, he settled in a former water mill in Hérouval, Oise. This place was a haven of creation and social life until his death. During these first years in France, he developed a particularly strong friendship with Bernard Réquichot, a French artist who died in 1961.

== Active years in France (1962–2010) ==
=== Painting and drawing ===
Dado's painting and drawing activities extended across almost six decades. His paintings are mainly oil painting on linen but he also used acrylic paint and wood or even metal plates as supports.

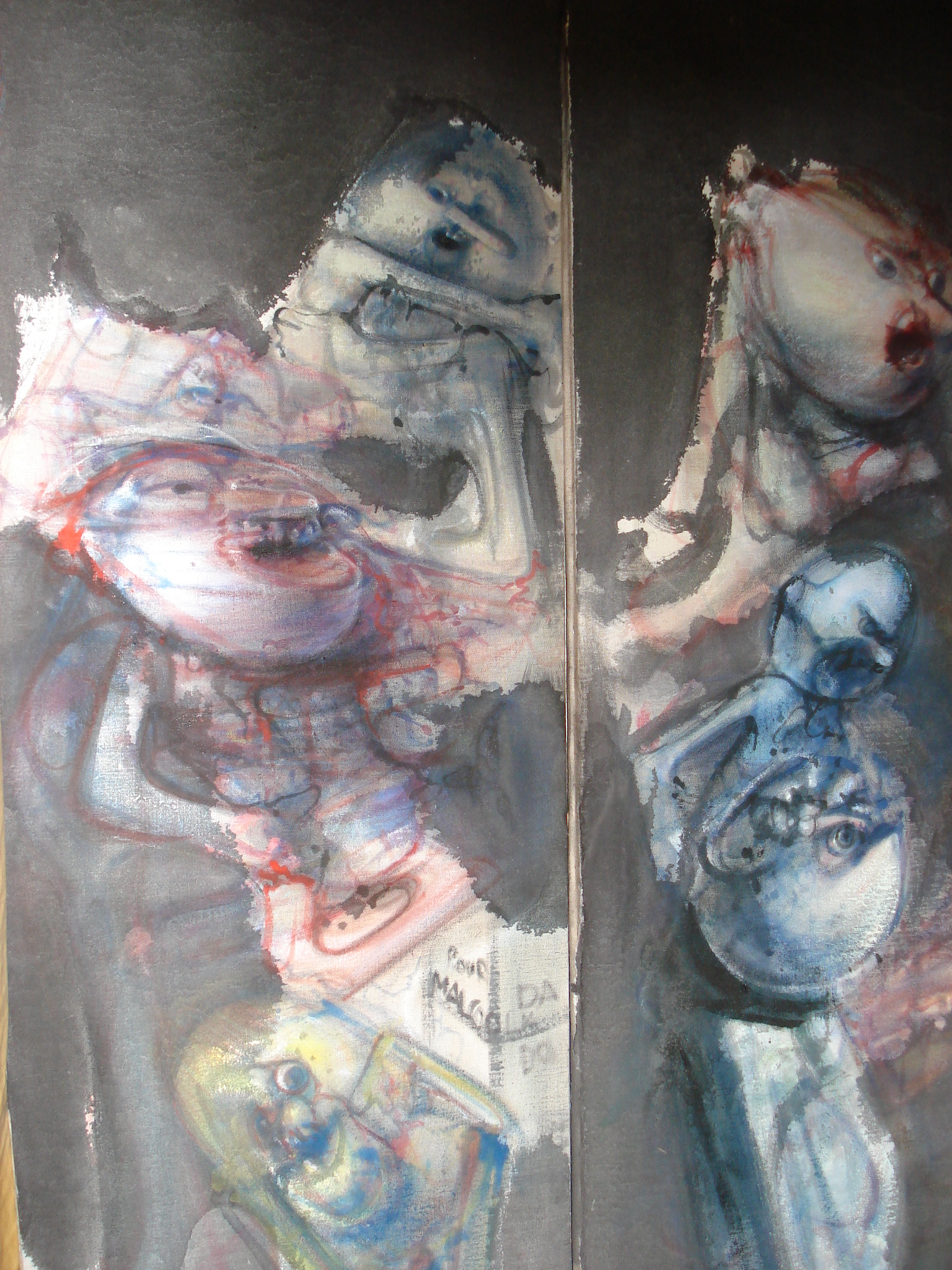
Oil painting on linen – untitled, 1997

Though his creative world is highly recognizable, his style and painting technique evolved along the years. While painting, he conducted a permanent search for the essence of energy, progressively abandoning details and fine techniques in favour of more colourful and dynamic compositions.

An illustration of this evolution can be seen in large paintings such as Les Limbes or Le Massacre des Innocents (1958–1959), La Grande Ferme. Hommage à Bernard Réquichot (1962–1963), Le Diptyque d'Hérouval (1975–1976) and L'École de Prescillia (2001–2002), in the collections of the Centre Pompidou, Musée national d'art moderne, Paris.

From the 1990s, Dado also involved himself in several ambitious fresco projects. The four most noticeable achievements are a blockhaus in Fécamp (Normandy), the embassy of the IVth International in Montjavoult (near Hérouval), a set of frescos in a former vine industry building in Domaine des Orpellières, Hérault and a Last Judgment fresco in the former chapel of a leper colony in the town of Gisors, Eure.

Drawing had been present in Dado's creative means of expression since his beginnings. The artist initially used pencils and India ink. He also resorted to mixed techniques using gouache, pencils and India ink, realising impressive collages.

=== Engravings ===
Dado realised his first engraving (a dry-point) in 1966 in Georges Visat's workshop. He was also interested in lithography. Dado started exploring the techniques of engraving (copper-plate engraving and etching) with the help of Alain Controu in Normandy in 1967. Their collaboration continued until the 1990s.

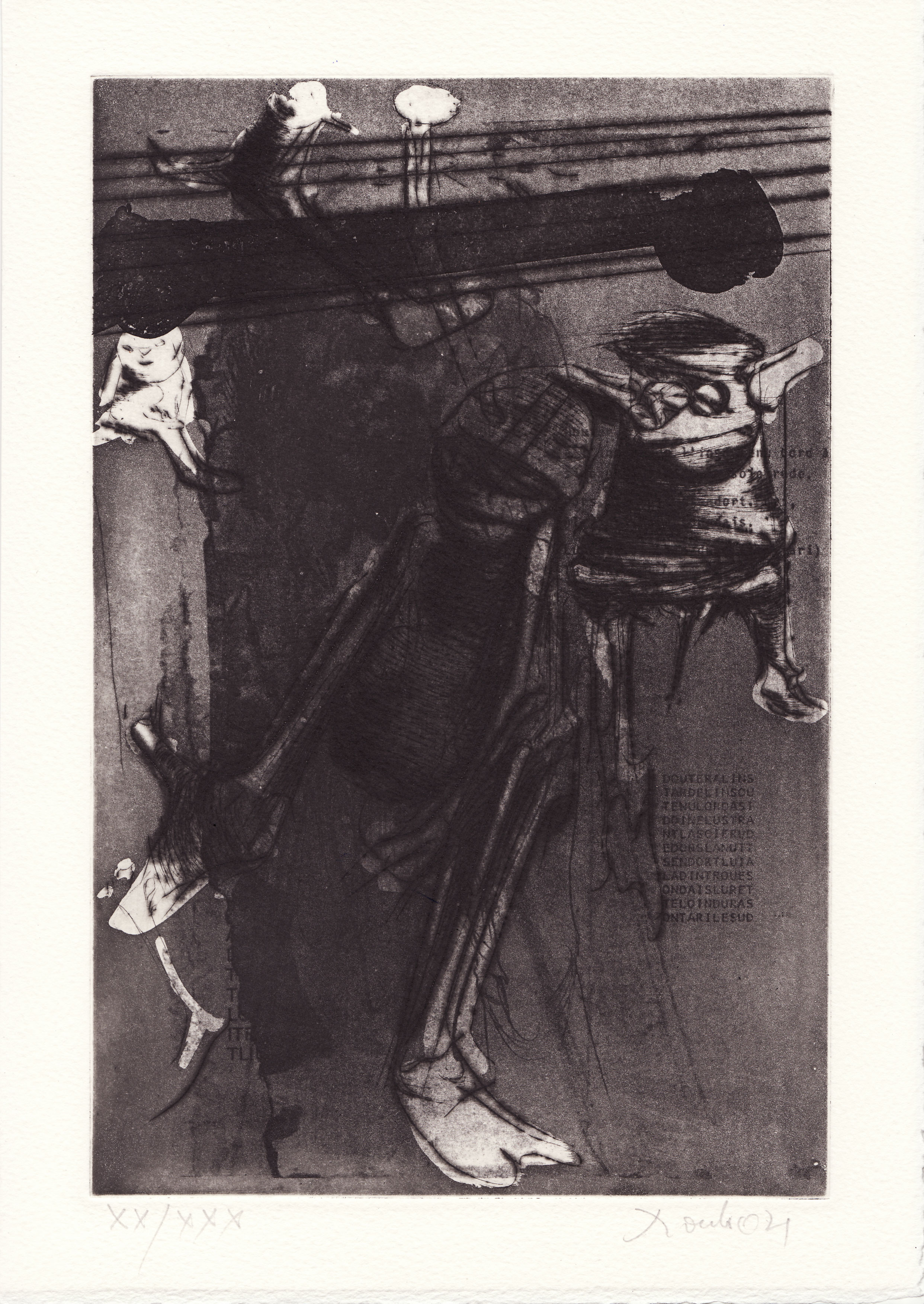
Engraving on copper-plate – untitled, 2004

He continued a substantial work in this domain, including several years in the 1980s in the Lacourière-Frélaut Engraving workshop in Paris and in an engraving workshop close to Hérouval (collaboration with engraver Biel Genty). A part of his engraving work features in the collections of the Département des estampes et de la Photographie of the Bibliothèque nationale de France (in English: The Department of Stamps and Photography of the National Library of France).

=== Sculpture and ceramics ===
Sculpture played a particular role in Dado's creation, as premises can be seen as early as in 1962 but most works were made in the 2000s until his death. In 1962, Dado's first achievement in sculpture was a pole using cattle bones collected in a knacker's yard.

In 1968, Dado exhibited a Citroën Traction Avant car in the CNAC, Paris. The car wreck appearance was totally changed by a profusion of bones. Dado returned mainly to sculpture in his last decade of creation. In 2009 and under the auspices of Montenegro, a set of 27 sculptures Les Elégies Zorzi was exhibited in the Zorzi palace during the Venice Art Biennale.

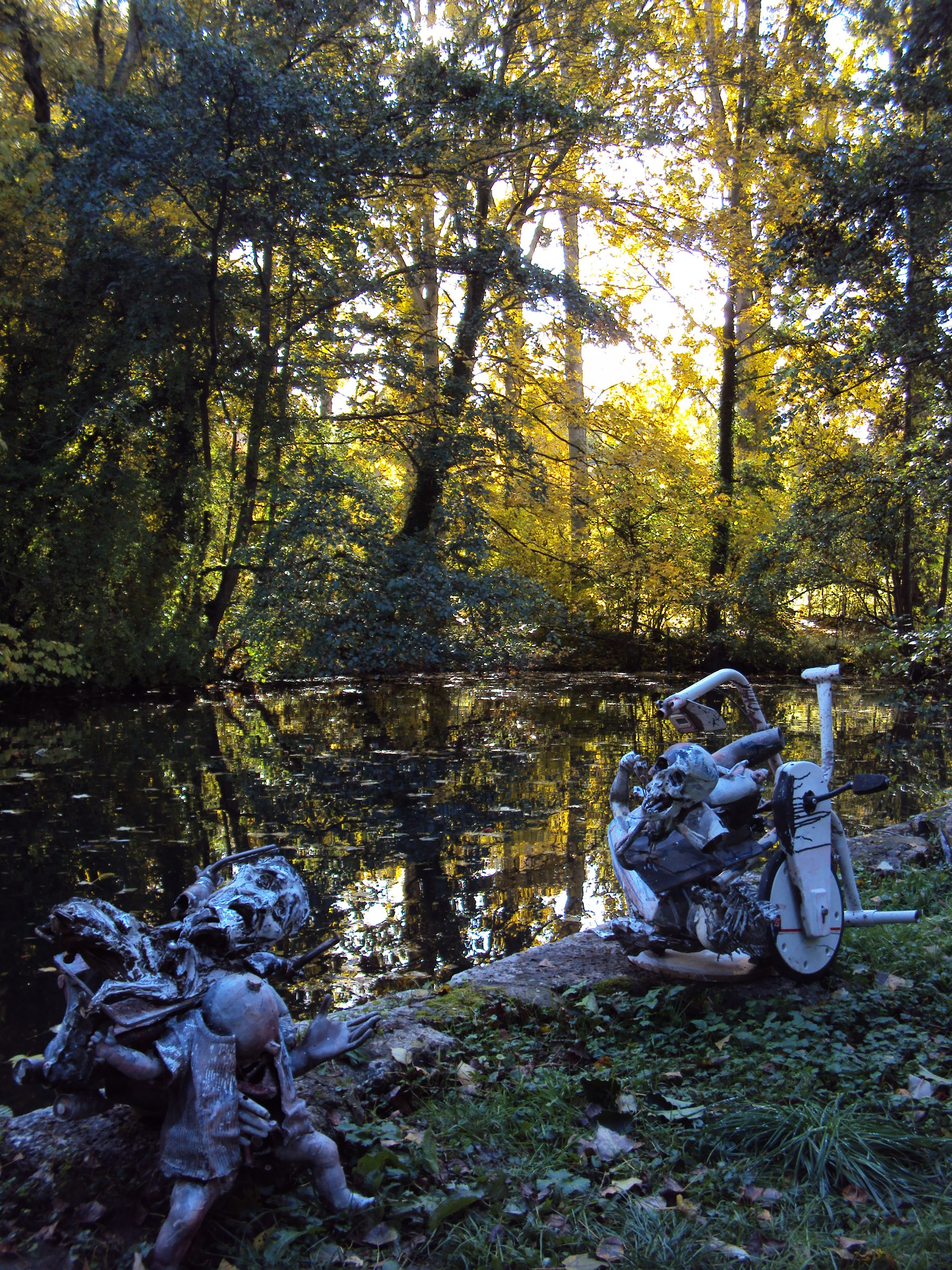
Temporary Installation of Sculptures by the artist, autumn 2010

From the mid-1990s to 2000, the artist also explored the use of ceramics as a medium for his creation. A most noticeable achievement in this field is a set of ceramics tiles in tribute to French writer Irène Némirovsky.

=== Collection books ===
A fervent books collector and reader, Dado found opportunities to work with writers, poets or essayists, who most of time were friends of him. Having met French writer Georges Perec, Dado illustrated Alphabets, a book dedicated to word play (1976). After Georges Perec's death, Dado would work on a second version of the book, mainly consisting in enriched illustrations of the first version.

In 1985, he worked on a series of 9 dry-point engravings to illustrate Le Terrier by Franz Kafka, at the Lacourière-Frélaut workshop.

In 1989, he illustrated Le Bonheur dans le crime by Barbey d'Aurevilly published with the Imprimerie nationale. Two important collaborators of Dado were the writers Claude Louis-Combet and Pierre Bettencourt. Bettencourt and Dado produced illustrated versions of Les plus belles Phrases de la Langue française (1990), Voyage sur la Planète innommée (1990) and Les Négriers jaunes (1995).

Their collaboration started in 1984 when Pierre Bettencourt wrote a text for an exhibition catalogue of paintings inspired by Buffon's work. As a son of the teacher of biology, Dado was fascinated by natural science.

Claude Louis-Combet, a long-time friend, and Dado produced several books. Some of those texts were specifically written in order to be published with illustrations of Dado. Including those is Les Oiseaux d'Irène (2007), a personal tribute of both artists to writer Irène Némirovsky and Dadomorphes & Dadopathes, with 5 engravings by Dado, published with Deyrolles in 1992.

In the 2000s, Dado worked with Jean-Marc Rouillan with the publishing of Les Viscères polychromes de la Peste brune, 2009.

=== Production design ===
- In 1993, Dado took part to the production design of Handel's Tamerlano for the Badisches Staatstheater Karlsruhe, direction Jean-Louis Martinoty, conductor Roy Goodman.
- In 1996, Dado renewed his experience in production design with the world premiere of Llanto por Ignacio Sanchez of Stavros Xarchakos, based on a poem by Lorca, direction Pierre Jourdan, in the Théatre Impérial de Compiègne, France.

=== Digital works ===
Dado realizes his first digital collages from 1996 in the printing workshop of his sister, Marija. Some of these works will be reproduced later in the Swiss art review Trou.

Several digital collages based on photographs by Domingo Đurić were shown at the Venice Biennale in 2009. From 2007, Dado devoted himself to the creation of a website with the help of his son-in-law, a virtual antimuseum, The Dado Syndrome.

In 2010, as a virtual museum, for its English version, the website was granted by ICOM permission to use the top-level domain .museum which was limited exclusively to museums until 2018, when AFNIC was designated by ICOM as the world registry operator for .museum and relaxed eligibility rules. The site is trilingual: French/Montenegrin/English.

== Dado in public collections ==
- Centre Pompidou, Musée national d'art moderne, Paris, France
- Musée des Abattoirs, Toulouse, France
- Musée régional d'Art contemporain de la Région Languedoc-Roussillon
- MOMA, New York, United States
- National Museum of Montenegro, Cetinje, Montenegro

== Personal life ==
Dado met his wife Hessie, a Cuban artist, during a trip to New York in 1962. Originally native of the Caribbean, she moved to Hérouval and married him. They raised five children together.

Though staying most of the time in his secluded home, Dado occasionally left his place to feed his interest in the outer world. In 1984, he was made a Chevalier of the Ordre des Arts et des Lettres.

Besides travelling several times to New York, he had a unique experience joining a team of medical researchers in Central Africa in 1974, spending a month with the Pygmies of the Central African Republic rainforest. Other noticeable experiences were a discovery of India in 1992 and a trip to Guatemala in 1997.

Influence of these trips is reflected in paintings such as the Boukoko triptyque (1974) and Tikal (1998).

Dado died at the age of 77 in Pontoise near Paris on November 27, 2010.

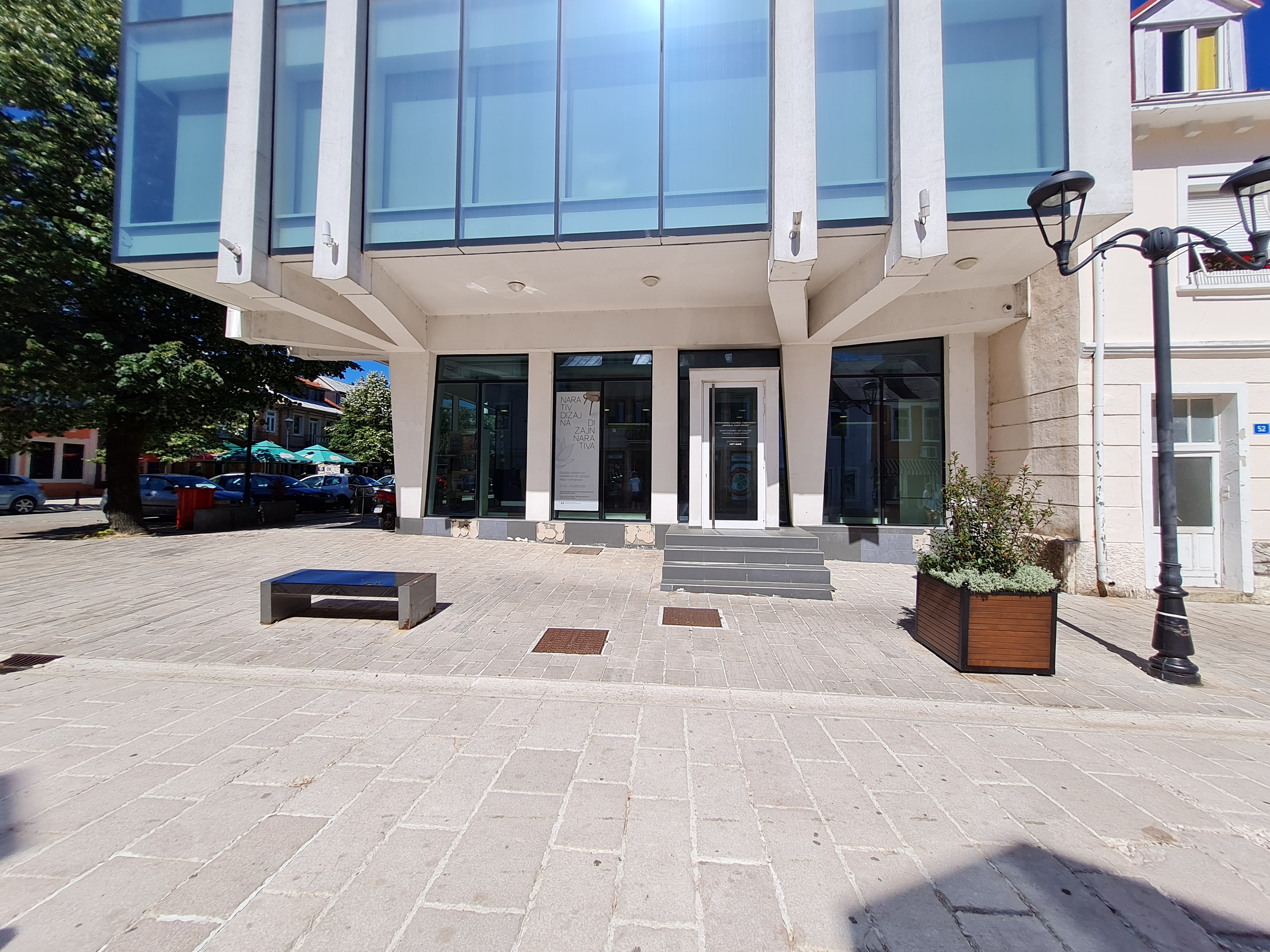
Miodrag Dado Đurić Gallery in Cetinje

In 2012, the National Museum of Montenegro opened a branch in Cetinje, The Montenegrin Art Gallery "Miodrag Dado Đurić" to honor Dado and his importance for Montenegrin art.

== Bibliography ==
- Jean-Louis Andral, Donations Daniel Cordier. Le regard d'un amateur, Paris, Centre Pompidou, 1989.
- Alice Bellony-Rewald, "Dado", Colóquio, no. 15, December 1973
- Alain Bosquet, Dado: un univers sans repos, Paris, La Différence, 1991
- Daniel Cordier, Huit ans d'agitation, Paris, Galerie Daniel Cordier, 1964
- Daniel Cordier, Georges Limbour, "Alii", Dado, œuvres de 1955 à 1964, Vence, Galerie Chave, 2004
- Gilles Deleuze, André Descamps, "Alii", Dado Arras 1997. Exposition dédiée par l'artiste à Maximilien Robespierre, Arras, Galerie Noroit-Arras, 1997
- Christian Derouet, Dado: l'exaspération du trait, Paris, Centre Georges Pompidou, 1981–1982
- Michel Faucher, Emmanuel Pernoud, Dado: gravures 1967/1997, Chartreuse Saint-Sauveur, Art-en-Chartreuse, 1997
- Catherine Gaich, Alain Mousseigne, "Alii", Dado-Réquichot: La guerre des nerfs, Toulouse, Les Abattoirs, 2002

== Sources ==
- Bosquet, Alain (1991). Dado: un univers sans repos. La Différence. ISBN 978-2-7291-0693-5. (monograph)
