= Aquarelle (disambiguation) =

Aquarelle is a synonym for watercolor painting.

Aquarelle may also refer to:

- Aquarelle.com Group, a French flower delivery company
- Aquarelle, a 2018 album by Mahsa Zargaran
- "Aquarelle of Brazil", a 1939 song by Ary Barroso
