= .re =

Internet country-code top level domain for Réunion

- Introduced: 7 April 1997
- TLD type: Country code top-level domain
- Status: Active
- Registry: AFNIC
- Sponsor: AFNIC
- Intended use: Entities connected with Réunion
- Actual use: Used in Réunion; also used for websites related to real estate and occasionally for domain hacks
- Registration restrictions: Registrant must be based in a European Union member state, Iceland, Liechtenstein, Norway, Switzerland
- Structure: Registrations are made at second level, or at third level beneath some second-level names
- Documents: Naming charter for .re
- Dispute policies: Alternative Dispute Resolutions
- DNSSEC: Yes
- Registry website: AFNIC.fr

.re is the Internet country code top-level domain (ccTLD) for Réunion (a French island located in the Indian Ocean, east of Madagascar). Along with .fr, .tf, and .ovh, it is administered by AFNIC.

In recent years, the .re TLD has been increasingly used for real estate–related domains, including place names (neighborhoods, cities, countries, etc.), real estate companies, developers/projects, property-related websites, and individual realtors and estate agents around the world. The .re domain has also been applied to insurance and reinsurance companies (e.g. swiss.re), those involved with reverse engineering, and as domain hacks for words ending in .re (for example, adventu.re or nearfutu.re), similar to contractions used with other TLDs (for example, websites such as bit.ly and delicio.us). Domains with the .re TLD can be registered with some of the largest online registrars such as Name.com, as well as most European domain registrars.

Since 6 December 2011, the rules for registering French domains have shifted. The owner of a domain no longer needs to be based in France or Overseas France anymore, with all individuals, companies and organizations residing in the European Union able register domains of France or its possessions.

== Two-character domains ==
.re allows two-character domains with at least one number. So, m7.re or 42.re are acceptable, while fi.re is not.

== Second-level domains ==
In addition to direct second level registrations, registrations have been made at the third level beneath these names:

- .asso.re: associations
- .nom.re: surnames
- .com.re: commercial (unrestricted registration)

Starting December 6, 2011, domain names at the official subdomains can no longer be registered. The owner of such domain names can renew their existing domains.

== See also ==
- .eu: CC TLD for the European Union
- .fr: CC TLD for the Republic of France
- Internet in France
- ISO 3166-2:RE
