= Hessie =

Cuban textile artist

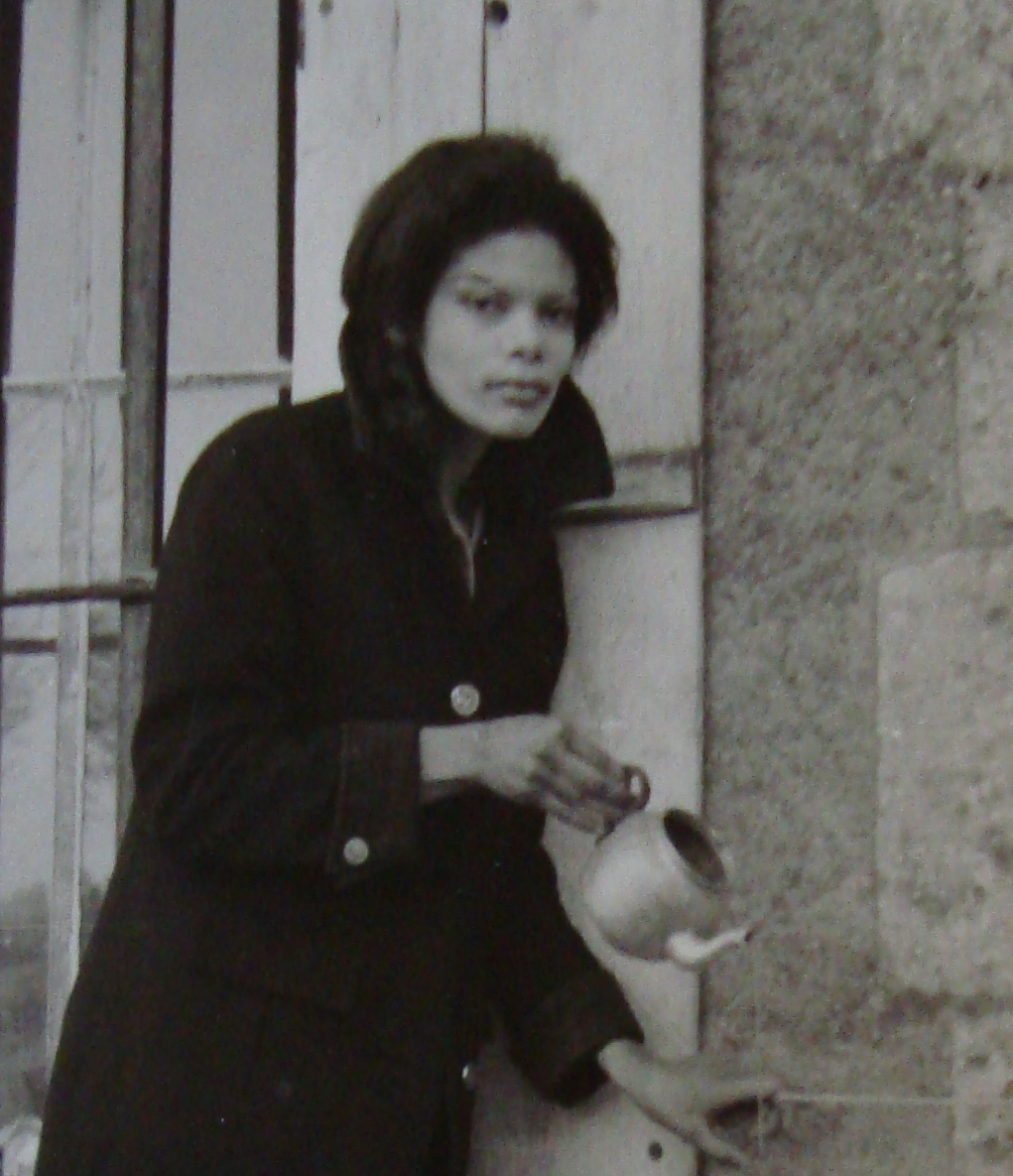
- Hessie in Hérouval in the 60's
- Born: 17 April 1936; Santiago, Cuba
- Died: 9 October 2017 (aged 81); Pontoise, France
- Other name: Carmen Lydia Đurić
- Citizenship: Montenegrin
- Occupation: Textile artist
- Spouse: Dado
- Children: 5

Carmen Lydia Đurić (17 April 1936 – 9 October 2017), known by her artist name Hessie, was a Cuban textile artist who lived in France from 1962 until her death. Her creative work was mainly focused on embroidery using fabrics, although she also used the technique of collage with waste materials.

== Early life and education (1936–1962) ==
After leaving her birthplace of Santiago, Cuba, she spent some time in New York with her two children, Yasfaro and Domingo, to work as a model, where she met Montenegrin artist Dado (né Miodrag Đurić), three years her senior, and a protégé of French artist Jean Dubuffet. Carmen and Dado fell in love and married. The couple returned together to France and set up home in a converted mill in a small village outside of Paris. and settled with him in rural Normandy in 1962. Together they raised five children.

She did not attend any art school and developed her own creative technique as early as 1956 with materials that were both affordable and easily available. Fabrics and textile cuts were materials she used from the beginning.

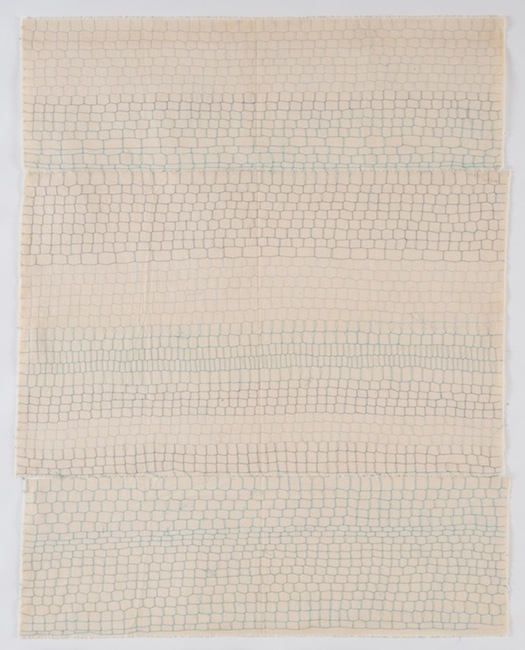
Hessie, "Grillage Tubino 4834", 1975–76. Set of three blue thread embroideries on unbleached cotton, 104 x 82 cm.

== Active years in France (from 1962) ==
Embroidery constituted the major part of Hessie's practice, but her work – which has attracted renewed attention in recent years – embraces a broader scope than is at first apparent. Cuba-born but based in France since 1962, Hessie developed her signature practice from the 1970s on: seductive, rigorous compositions of abstract and geometric motifs in white or coloured cotton thread on unbleached cotton canvas.

More infrequently, her works feature stitched-on buttons, holes, or typewritten letters dispersed across the fabric support, together with collages of objects or materials on paper. Her repetitive techniques are the basis for a strict formal repertory, expressed in series of works with functional, descriptive titles: Grillages (grid forms), Bâtons pédagogiques (teaching sticks), Végétation or Machines à écrire (typewriters).

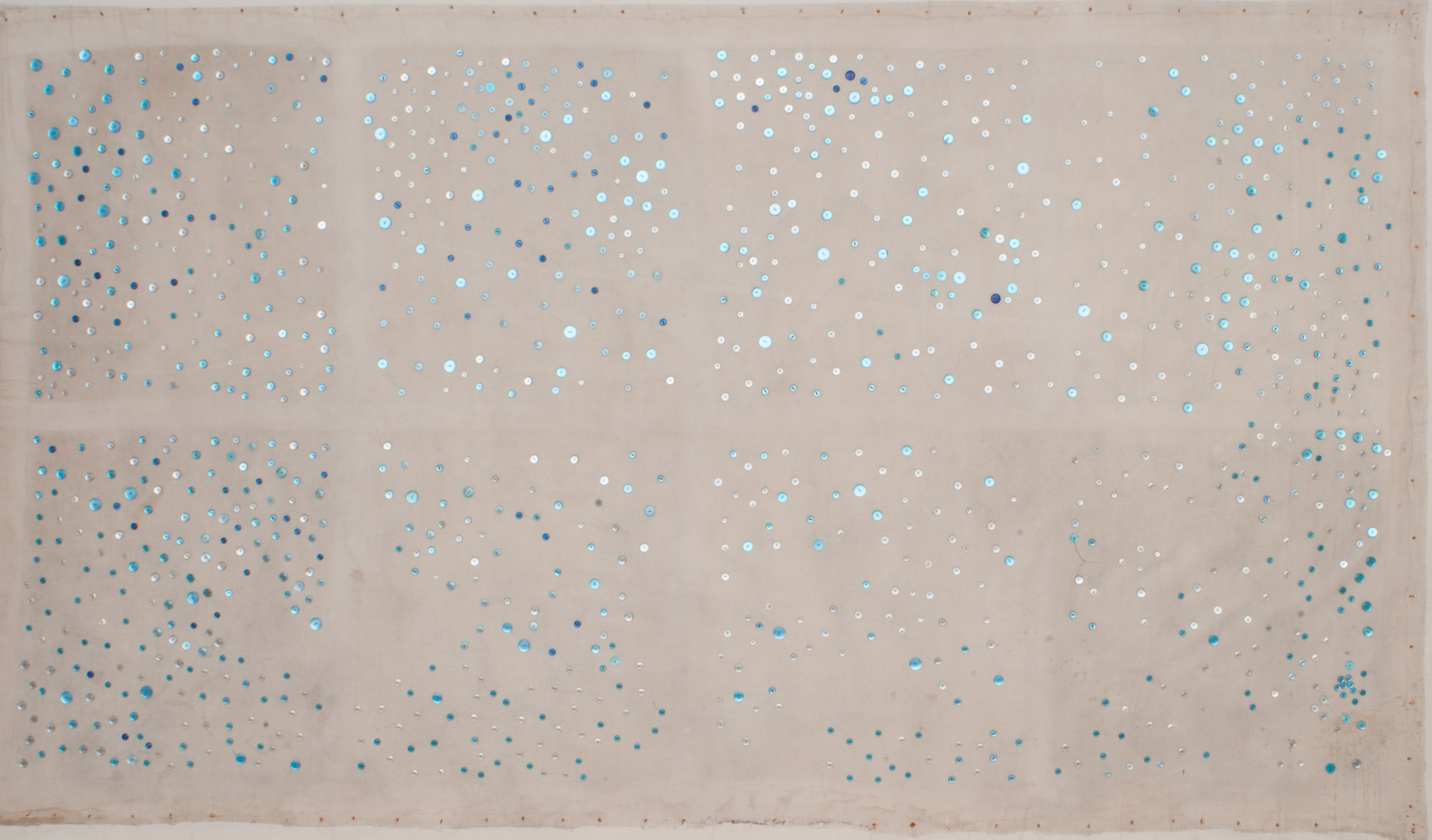
Hessie "Boutons bleus", 1974–75 Grey and blue buttons sewn on unbleached cotton, 165 x 295 cm.

Hessie died in Pontoise, France on 9 October 2017 at the age of 81.

== Solo shows ==
- 1975 ARC 2, Musée d’Art moderne de la Ville de Paris : « Survival Art : Hessie ».
- 1976 Galerie Marcel Billot, Paris : « Hessie ».
- 1978 Konsthall, Lund (Suède) : « Hessie / Survival Art ».
- 2015 Galerie Arnaud Lefebvre, Paris : « Hessie : Survival Art 1969–2015 ».
- 2015 FIACOFFICIELLE, Paris : « Hessie : Survival Art 1969–2015 ».
- 2016 Galerie Arnaud Lefebvre, Paris : « Hessie : Collages & Papiers ».
- 2016 ART BRUSSELS, Brussels.
- 2016 La BF15, Lyon, France : « Hessie : Silence ».
- 2016 Galerie Arnaud Lefebvre, Paris : « Survival Art 2016 ».
- 2016 La Verrière Hermès, Brussels : « Soft résistance ».
- 2016 FIAC Grand Palais, Paris.
- 2017-2018 Les Abattoir, Toulouse: "Hessie, Survival Art"

== Group exhibitions ==
- 1969 Institut de Cachin : « Tendance avant-garde », France
- 1972 Centre national d’Art contemporain, Paris : « Collection de Madame et Monsieur B ».
- 1972 Galerie des Locataires, Traveling exhibition in France
- 1973 Galerie Yvon Lambert, Paris.
- 1973 Le Grand Palais, Paris : « Salon comparaison ».
- 1974 Iris Clert / Christofle, Paris : « Grandes femmes, Petits formats : Micro-salon 1974, 99 exposantes ».
- 1974 ARC, Musée d’Art moderne de la Ville de Paris : « Art vidéo / Confrontation 74 »
- 1975 Galerie Rona, Brussels.
- 1976 Kunsthandel Brinkinau, Amsterdam : « Art boxes ».
- 1976 AIR Gallery, New York: « Combative Acts, Profiles and Voices: An Exhibition of Women Artists from Paris ».
- 1976 ARC 2, Musée d’Art moderne de la Ville de Paris : « Boîtes ».
- 1976 UNESCO, Paris : « Dialogues ».
- 1977 Nancy Spero, New York
- 1977 Maison de la Culture, Rennes, France : « Boîtes ».
- 1977 Musée des Arts décoratifs, Paris : « Broderies au passé et au présent ».
- 1977 Galerie Baudoin Lebon, Paris.
- 1979 Centre Pompidou, Paris : « Ateliers aujourd'hui : œuvres contemporaines des collections nationales : accrochage II ».
- 1980 Centre culturel municipal Jacques Prévert, Villeparisis, France : « Travaux sur papier / objets ».
- 1983 Fondation Nationale des Arts Graphiques et Plastiques, Paris : « Nœuds & Ligatures ».
- 1989 Centre Pompidou, MNAM, Paris : « Daniel Cordier : le regard d’un amateur ».
- 1998 Galerie EOF, Paris : « Archipel 98 (1) ».
- 2002 Musée Denys-Puech, Rodez, France : « Affinités ».
- 2005 Les Abattoirs, Toulouse, France : « Merci Monsieur Cordier ».
- 2007 Les Abattoirs, Toulouse, France : « Absolumental 2 ».
- 2008 CRAC, Montbéliard, France : « Champs d’expériences ».
- 2008 L’Atelier blanc, Villefranche-de-Rouergue : « Le monde de Dado ».
- 2008 Centre artistique Manoir du Moulin Blanc, Verderonne, France : « Les Dado ».
- 2009 Les Abattoirs, Toulouse, France : « Les désordres du plaisir ».
- 2009 Centre Pompidou, MNAM, Paris : « elles@centrepompidou ».
- 2015 Galerie Arnaud Lefebvre, Paris : « Cosmogonie ».
- 2015 Galerie Arnaud Lefebvre, Paris : « Autoportraits ».
- 2015 Les Abattoirs, Toulouse, France : « Daniel Cordier : motifs et séries ».
- 2015 Galerie Arnaud Lefebvre, Paris : « Artistes de la galerie ».
- 2016 La Verrière Hermès, Brussels : « Poésie balistique ».

== Publications ==
- Survival Art: Hessie ARC 2, Musée d’Art Moderne de la Ville de Paris, 12 fév-16 mars 1975
- Combative Acts, Profiles and Voices – An exhibition of women artists from Paris, works by Bour, Hessie, Janicot, Maglione and collective work by Aballea, Blum, Croiset, Mimi and Yalter, Aline Dallier, New York, 1976
- Hessie: Survival Art Marianne Nanne-Brahammar, Lund, 1978
- Activités et réalisations de femmes dans l'art contemporain: un premier exemple: les œuvres dérivées des techniques textiles traditionnellesJacqueline Gauvreau, Aline Dallier-Popper, Thèse de doctorat, Esthétique, Paris 8, 1980.
- Affinités: œuvres de la collection des Abattoirs Toulouse Musée Denys-Puech, Rodez, du 7 juin au 13 octobre 2002, préface de Laurence Imbernon, 104 pages.
- Daniel Cordier : le regard d’un amateur donation Daniel Cordier dans les collections du Centre Pompidou, Musée national d’art moderne: [exposition, Paris, Centre Pompidou, 14 novembre 1989–21 janvier 1990], catalogue sous la direction de Bénédicte Ajac, Nouvelle éd. Revue et corrigée, Toulouse: les Abattoirs; Paris: Centre Pompidou, 2005.
- Art, féminisme, post-féminisme: un parcours de critique d'art Aline Dallier-Popper, L’Harmattan, Paris, 2009
- Dictionnaire universel des créatrices sous la direction de Marie Laure Bernadac, notice de Sonia Recasens, Éditions des Femmes-Antoinette Fouque, 2013.
- Cosmogonies: Hessie, Kapwani Kiwanga, Myriam Mihindou catalogue d'exposition présentée à la Galerie Arnaud Lefebvre en janvier 2015, publication dirigée par Sonia Recasens, commissaire de l'exposition
- Hessie: Survival Art 1969–2015, avec les textes d’Émilie Bouvard, Philippe Cyroulnik, Yanitza Đurić, Fabienne Dumont, Nathalie Ernoult, Arnaud Lefebvre, Aurélie Noury, Diana Quinby, Sonia Recasens, Claude Schweisguth, Amarante Szidon, Anne Tronche, Sarah Wilson, Paris, Galerie Arnaud Lefebvre, 2015.
