= .wf =

Internet country code top-level domain for the Wallis and Futuna Islands

- Introduced: 14 November 1997
- TLD type: Country code top-level domain
- Registry: AFNIC
- Sponsor: AFNIC
- Intended use: Entities connected with Wallis and Futuna
- Actual use: Open for registration, but only sees limited use
- Registration restrictions: Registrant must be based in a European Union member state, Iceland, Liechtenstein, Norway, Switzerland
- DNSSEC: Yes
- Registry website: nic.wf (redirects to afnic.fr)

.wf is the Internet country code top-level domain (ccTLD) for the Wallis and Futuna Islands. This top-level domain is run by the AFNIC and registrations are open to all.

== See also ==
- Internet in France
- ISO 3166-2:WF
- .fr – ccTLD for France
- .eu – ccTLD for the European Union
