= Telecommunications in Mayotte =

There are telecommunications in Mayotte.

Vivendi Universal had small telecommunications networks in Mayotte in 2013.

== Telephones ==
The number of telephones was 400 in 1981 and 450 by 1989. The number of telephone main lines in use was 9,314 in 1997 and 10,000 in 2001 and 2002.

The number of mobile cellular phones was 21,700 in 2002 and 48,100 in 2004.

In 2001, the telephone system was small, and it was administered by French Department of Posts and Telecommunications. The international telephone system included microwave radio relay and HF radiotelephone communications to Comoros and other international connections. The international country code is 269.

== Radio ==
In 1998, there was one AM radio station.

The number of FM radio stations was four in 1998 and five in 2001.

== Television ==
Television broadcasting began in 1986 with RFO Mayotte (as it was then known). There were three television broadcast stations in 1997 and 2001. There were 3,500 televisions in 1994.

== Internet ==
The country code for the top-level domain is .yt.

There was one internet host in 2006.
