= Gitoyen =

French Economic Interest Group

Gitoyen is an Economic Interest Group based in France gathering several companies and non-profits to share efforts to provide internet services to non-profits. It is effectively a telecom operator, providing tier 2 services to its members.

Members include Gandi, Alern, FDN and many others.

It was founded in 2001.

Until 2012 it managed the POUIX, an Internet exchange point based in Paris.

It has several peering agreements with various operators.
