= Bigblu Broadband =

ISP in the UK

Bigblu Broadband plc
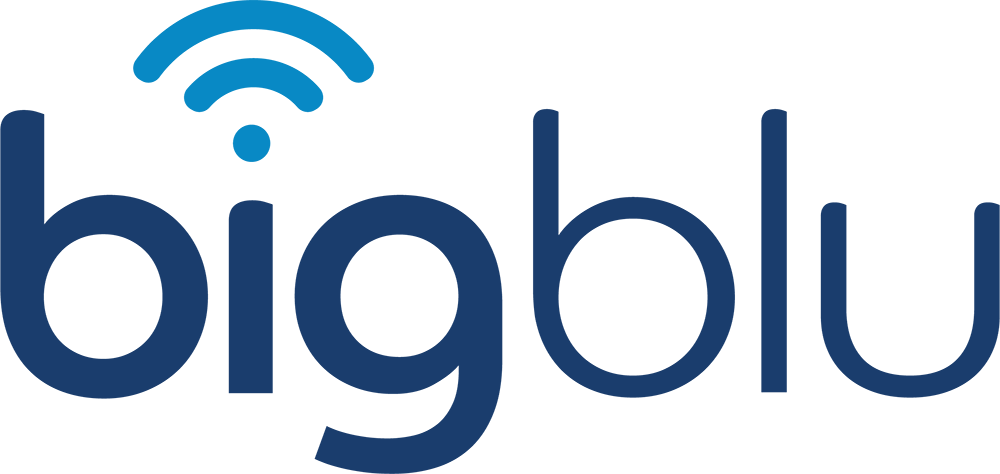
- Company type: Public Company
- Traded as: LSE: BBB
- Industry: Telecommunications
- Headquarters: Bicester, England, UK
- Area served: Worldwide
- Key people: Frank Waters (CEO)
- Products: Satellite, wireless and 4G Broadband
- Number of employees: 270 (2019)
- Website: www.bbb-plc.com

Bigblu Broadband, formerly Satellite Solutions Worldwide Group plc, is a UK-based provider of broadband services to rural homes and businesses across Europe.

== History ==
Bigblu was founded in November 2008 by Andrew Walwyn, Simon Clifton, Selwyn Petterson, and Tom Wheeler as Satellite Solutions Worldwide Group. The company offers satellite internet and superfast broadband to rural homes and businesses in 10 countries across Europe, including the UK.

Initially, the company focused on satellite broadband, becoming one of the largest satellite broadband ISPs worldwide. It later diversified and began offering alternative broadband using both satellite and ultra-fast fixed wireless. The business was listed on the London Stock Exchange (LSE) AIM market in May 2015. At this time it had approximately 10,000 customers, which has since grown through a mixture of organic and inorganic growth (through acquisitions) to approximately 120,000 customers. In 2018 it had revenues of £55 million (up 8%), but recorded a pre-tax loss of £9.5 million.

The company has partnerships with Eutelsat and NBN SkyMuster.

=== Timeline ===
- 2008 - Bigblu Broadband Plc was founded in November 2008 by Andrew Walwyn, Simon Clifton, Selwyn Petterson and Tom Wheeler.
- 2009 - The first distribution agreement was signed for Ku band Eutelsat Tooway services (maximum speed of 2 Mbit/s download, 256 kbit/s upload).. The BBB website was designed and launched in March to market satellite broadband with a full e-commerce offering; becoming the first company in Europe to do so.. The online customer portal was launched to give customers access to their account and the ability to manage and alter their service offering; again, the first company in Europe to do this.
- 2010 - The ToowayDirect.com was put into place in October, a dedicated site focused on Eutelsat's Tooway brand. In November, the launch of Ka Sat, the first Ka band satellite over Europe – significantly improved speeds over Ku band technology.
- 2011 - The signed distribution agreement with Eutelsat was implemented in June for new Ka band Tooway services across Europe (maximum speeds of 10 Mbit/s download, 4 Mbit/s upload).
- 2013 - A distribution agreement was signed with SES for their new Ka band network. Bigblu Broadband Plc's European offering re-branded as Europasat in May reflecting multi-network, independent proposition (maximum speeds of 20 Mbit/s download, 6 Mbit/s upload).
- 2015 - The company was listed on the AIM stock exchange
- 2016 - Bought the satellite division of Avonline for £10 million. Bought Breiband.no and Skymesh for £11.7 million
- 2017 - Acquires Quickline Communications
- 2018 - Rebranded as BigBlu Broadband. Partnered with Eurobroadband (a Eutelsat subsidiary)
- 2019 - BBB invested £12 million in its subsidiary Quickline Communications Quickline buys JHCS.
- 2020 - BBB subsidiary Quickline Communications will lead a £6 million project to boost rural connectivity in North Yorkshire

== Products and services ==
Bigblu Broadband Plc trades as bigblu and offers satellite broadband via the Tooway satellite platform to 120,000 customers across a number of different markets:

- Broadcasters - the company offers broadcasters connectivity when broadcasting from remote regions or areas without sufficient bandwidth.
- Business - providing last mile and last resort internet and private circuit connectivity, allocated links, recovery and back-up system connectivity, a selection of voice, data and video and connectivity in isolated locations.
- Consumer - providing connectivity in rural areas to communities currently not covered by main network operators.
- Government and military - BBB produce hardware to secure networks and delivers dedicated satellite broadband for Government and Military use and security surveillance connectivity in remote areas.

== Subsidiaries and brands within the BBB Group ==
BBB has grown through acquisition, acquiring 20 companies across 9 countries. It sold off 11,000 Australian customers it gained from the SkyMesh acquisition to Superloop for A$1.5m (US$1.1m)

- SkyMesh – Australia
- Europasat
- Quickline Communications – UK
- Bordernet - Australia
- Breiband - Norway
- Open Sky - Italy
- satinternet.com - Germany

== Controversy ==
In 2019 the company apologised for a spate of billing and debt collection problems combined with unresponsive customer service.
