= World-NET =

World-NET was the first French Internet service provider (along with FranceNet) for the general public in France. It operated from 1994 to 2002.

== History ==
Sébastien Socchard, Philippe Langlois, Pierre Séguret and Xavier Niel launched World-NET services on February 15, 1994, after a trip to the United States in 1993, where Internet access was taking off.

At that time, the only existing professional Internet service provider in France was Oléane. There was no service available to individuals. World-NET replaced the computer security company SCT (Security Concept and Technology, the security advising company created by Sébastien on October 9, 1988). Franck Arnal and Franck Landais soon joined Sébastien Socchard to develop the service. Connection fees were initially 80 francs per hour, and then on November 11, 1994 they changed to 230 francs per month. World-NET's websites were worldnet.fr and worldnet.net.

On September 15, 1994, for the first time in France, hundreds of thousands of connection kits offering three hours of free Internet access were distributed in the computer magazines InfoPC and Le Monde Informatique (an IDG group publication). Millions of CDs were subsequently distributed in several French magazines.

In October 1994, World-NET had to handle the influx of 1,000 new subscribers every month, which overloaded its equipment. Even so, PC Expert named World-NET the "best Internet service provider" that same month.

In the next two years, the World-NET Access Internet connection kit was distributed in more than 30 books published by Sybex Mc Millan and Micro Application. The kit was first provided on floppy disks, and then on CD-ROMs.

World-NET was a pioneer in the emerging general public Internet access market, with innovations such as the first connection kit and the launch of an unlimited connection package costing 99 francs. It was the first in France to provide "personal pages" and to enable faxing to e-mail accounts. Also, World-Net was the first Internet Service Provider to be included in Microsoft Windows in France, allowing millions of users to access Internet. The company was sold on June 12, 2000 to Kaptech.

== Timeline ==
- On February 15, 1994, the service offering is launched during the "Computer Associates" trade fair. The first subscribers pay 80 francs an hour. World-NET acquires more than 3,000 subscribers the first year, who become the first French Internet users. A single access point is created in Paris. In 1994, World-NET becomes the first French ISP to be distributed in magazines, first on floppy disks (September 1994's InfoPC) and then on CD-ROM and books.
- In 1995, Xavier Niel becomes World-NET's business angel and acquires a stake in the company. He had been involved from the very beginning, lending World-NET office space and one of his company's 64 kbit/s lines. Even though he is never involved in the company's management, he does provide valuable advice throughout World-NET's existence.
- In February 1996, World-NET provides national access (through the number 36.64.40.00) at a connection speed varying from 14,400 to 28,800 bit/s. Ten access points are established all over France, which means that everyone in France can now connect to the Internet. Thanks to a very active partnership strategy, World-NET is distributed in more than 30 books on the topic of the Internet (Sybex, Mac Millan, Micro application, etc.). The hundreds of thousands of Olitec modems sold each year also include Worlnet CDs and enable the company to respond to the public's increasing need to connect to the Internet.
- In May 1996, Sébastien Socchard, head of World-NET, and Rafi Haladjian, CEO of FranceNet, are arrested and jailed for "possession of child pornography," on the grounds that their servers provide access to the most "sensitive" newsgroups on Usenet. This case sparks debate over the legal responsibilities of Internet service providers, who had up to then simply provided technical services allowing their subscribers to access the network, without censorship or screening. The case is dismissed two years later, and the law is changed so that heads of Internet companies can no longer be held responsible for the content available on the web.
- On January 21, 1997 World-NET is the first company whose Internet access offer is directly integrated into all French computers sold with Microsoft Windows. Users can access the service by simply clicking on the Internet Connection icon. The partnership with Microsoft enables World-NET to acquire thousands of new clients.
- In June 1997, World-NET reaches over 10,000 subscribers.
- In November 1997, World-NET offers a 56,000 bit/s connection. For the first time in France, each subscriber can now create a personal web site with the "page perso," forerunner to today's blogs.
- In August 1998, World-NET provides a service allowing subscribers to receive faxes sent to their e-mail accounts.
- On December 2, 1998, World-NET supports the boycott against France Télécom's high fees.
- In August 1999, clients can register .com, .net, and .org domain names via the web hosting service MyWeb.World-NET launches BookMyName.com, a registration service for .com, .net, .org, and .biz domain names.
- On November 3, 1999, World-NET offers ADSL service with a downstream bandwidth of 512 kbit/s and an upstream bandwidth of 128 kbit/s, at a price of 130 francs per month.

World-NET is the last remaining independent operator, with more than 22 million francs in sales and 3 million francs in profits. It is sold the 12 of Jun 2000 to the telecommunications company Kaptech (now Neuf Telecom) and ceases operations on May 31, 2002.

== IRC Network ==
World-NET provided an IRC network at irc.worldnet.net. After the domain name stopped being renewed in late 2018, the IRC network has been moved to irc.worldnet.fun and is maintained by volunteers.

== See also ==
- Internet in France
- Iliad
- Xavier Niel
- World-NET in French
