= French Data Network =

French association and internet access provider

French Data Network (FDN) is a French non-profit organization (association loi 1901) founded on June 2, 1992. Its purpose is: "the promotion, use and development of the Internet and Usenet networks in accordance with their ethics, in particular by encouraging non-commercial use for research and educational purposes", "the defense of public liberties on the Internet and the defense of the neutrality of telecommunication networks".

FDN is the oldest Internet service provider in France still in business, offering PSTN dial-up (since 1992), ADSL (since 2005), VPN (since 2013) and FTTH (since 2022) access to its members. It is a founding member of Gitoyen, a non-profit tier 2 operator.

FDN has also been politically active, taking a strong position against the HADOPI law. During the internet blackout in some countries during the Arab spring, it proposed RTC services to anyone able to access international phone calls. It has a strong position against censorship and in favor of network neutrality.

FDN is a founding member of the FDN Federation.
