= .mq =

Internet country code top-level domain for Martinique

- Introduced: March 28, 1997; 29 years ago
- TLD type: Country code top-level domain
- Status: Active
- Registry: DOMeNIC
- Sponsor: Canal+ Telecom
- Intended use: Entities connected with Martinique
- Actual use: Used by a handful of sites in Martinique
- Registration restrictions: Domain names must have at least three characters
- Structure: Names have been registered directly at second level
- Registry website: www.dom-enic.com

.mq is the Internet country code top-level domain (ccTLD) for Martinique.

The .mq top-level domain was managed by SYSTEL until SYSTEL was bought by Mediaserv. The registration services were later reopened, with the country code's current technical contact changing to Canal+ Telecom in Guadeloupe.

== See also ==
- Internet in France
- ISO 3166-2:MQ
- .fr –CC TLD for the French Republic
- .eu –CC TLD for the European Union
