= Digital divide in France =

Differences in access to information technologies

The digital divide in France refers to inequalities between individuals, households, and other groups of different demographic and socioeconomic levels in France in access to information and communication technologies (ICTs) and in the knowledge and skills needed to effectively use the information gained from connecting.

The digital divide refers to the gap in exposure to technology needed to access the internet and online resources amongst a population. This gap leads to a decrease in the standard of living for those without access to technology while the standard of living for those who do have access to technology increases exponentially. The global digital divide has been an issue for hundreds of years and is far from a new phenomenon. Currently, in most countries, the digital divide is becoming notably less wide due to an increase in availability of affordable electronic devices capable of accessing the internet and has led to an extraordinary increase in competition amongst technological markets. An increase in competition has resulted in increased exposure to new technology with internet access in even the lowest income areas. Despite the increased exposure to technology, there are still other elements of technological access that contribute to the gap. These disparities continue to contribute to the gap that divides nations and prevents historically underprivileged groups from meeting the societal standards that will allow them to thrive in current society.

The three digital divides in France are characterized as generational, social and cultural differences, according to a report released by the Center for Strategic Analysis in the French government. The generational gap generally affects the elderly since they are the most unfamiliar with newer technologies. The social divide affects the poor since they are less likely to have the budget for technological devices. The cultural divide affects the least educated of the French since they have fewer opportunities for properly utilizing technology.

== Internet Accessibility ==
In France internet accessibility is not equally distributed among the entire population. Factors that determine internet accessibility in the French community are age, education, and income. Higher internet availability was found among French residents younger than 30 years of age, completed some level of higher education, and are currently employed or in school.

=== Age ===
A decrease in internet accessibility correlates with increasing age in France. Those younger than 30 have been recorded to have the highest access to internet. French students retain the highest accessibility. After 30 years of age, accessibility declines. French 59 years and older retain the lowest internet accessibility.

Less than 17% of people over the age of 75 have a computer at their home. In comparison, more than 90% of people aged 15 to 24 have a home computer. This is quite a large divide with senior citizens who make up about 20% of the population.

=== Education ===
Higher education correlates to increasing internet accessibility. There is a sharp division between primary and secondary education. Secondary education graduates have four times the accessibility to internet versus those with only primary education. Post-secondary education degrees continue to show an exponential increase in internet accessibility.

=== Income ===
Households with higher income levels reflect an increased internet accessibility. Residents with higher salaries are more likely to be able to afford internet connection. The trend persists between employed and unemployed residents. The employed population is 40% more likely to have access to internet.

Of the individuals with lowest incomes in France only 34% have a home computer and only 28% have internet connection. In contrast, 91% of the individuals with considerable wealth have a home computer and 87% have internet connection.

== Language ==
A language system is normally included in information and communication technologies. Certain languages are more prominent in ICT's than others. Data collected in 2007 states that 45% of information on the internet is in English while 4.41% is in French. A separate study published by UNESCO in 2009 compared the amount of Wikipedia articles available per language. 2,259,431 articles (23.078%) were available in English and 629,004 articles (6.425%) were available in French. Of the total population in France, only 39% speak English.

== Solutions ==
France has made significant impact on closing the digital divide. Technological advancements and government funded programs have led to several innovative solutions and a narrowed gap between social classes within the nation regarding internet access and technological availability.

In 2004 the French government began a program to curb the nation's digital divide and starting offering a computer with high speed internet access to 1.2 million of its poorest citizens for just 1 euro a day. Mainly to ensure they would have access to the growing number of government services available online. Prime Minister Villepin announced the plan after a meeting of the interministerial committee for the Information Society. A similar project also launched in 2004 sought to put internet connected computers into the hands of university students, also for 1 euro a day, and between September 2004 and September 2005 the number of students with laptops rose from 8 to 22 percent.

The French Center for Strategic Analysis released several recommendations for bridging the digital divide in 2011. Since many digital divides exist they have decided to take political actions to close the gaps. They also want to use public information campaigns to educate people. For poor and uneducated households they will work to lower the costs associated with network access and also help with the cost of various types of devices for people to access those networks. There is an effort to try and better integrate older people into the digital society, by offering them assistance and education when it comes to participating in the digital society. They will integrate the use of digital technologies in education to highlight good internet practices and to reduce the inequalities in schools. There is a push to showcase 'digital natives', which are those who were born into the digital world, adapting new social behaviors because of the way they integrate new interactive technology into their lives.

== Minitel System ==
The Minitel System was one of France's earliest attempts to bridge the gap caused by the digital divide. The Minitel System, influenced greatly by the French government, was introduced in 1983 and "laid the groundwork for France's computerized future". The system provided French telephone users with access to online databases through their own personal phone line for no extra charge. The videotex service was accessed through a text-interface monitor and keyboard. Initially the system provided access only to things like phone books; however, in little time, users would be able to access numerous online services that allowed them to do things like view and pay bills and online shop. France Telecom made the service more user friendly, bundling users’ online purchases and telephone bills together. The Mintier System continued to grow and was able to provide access to "more than 20,000 online services before the World Wide Web even got off the ground". By the end of the 1980s, "every adult living in France had access to the network". The system proved to be very successful and continued to provide online content to French phone users until its demise in 2012.

== Libraries ==
One in four European internet users access the internet only outside of their home; this means that 1/4 of the current European internet users would not have access to the internet at all if it weren't for places with free public access to the internet such as government funded programs like libraries. The libraries of France are considered to be largely influenced by their political intentions to level the success and education levels amongst the social classes. These libraries are strategically placed in low income areas and on the outskirts of big cities where incomes tend to be lower and crime and unemployment rates tend to be higher. Unlike the United States and comparable nations, French libraries have extended hours and are open on all days of the week. Librarians working in these facilities generally have an aspiration to help those of struggling communities enhance their education and learn to use new technology. These facilities have proven to be helpful in bridging the gap between high and low income social classes by exposing French citizens of low income areas to new technology, providing them with access to the internet, and thus lowering unemployment rates.

== See also ==
- Digital divide by country
- Digital Opportunity Index
- Knowledge divide
- Mercedes divide
