= SkyMesh =

Australian telecommunications carrier and ISP

Skymesh Pty. Ltd.
- Type: Privately held company
- Industry: Telecommunication
- Founded: Brisbane, Australia (2005)
- Headquarters: Brisbane City, Australia
- Area served: Australia
- Services: Internet service provider; Wireless broadband; POTS Telephony
- Website: www.skymesh.net.au

Skymesh is an Australian telecommunications carrier and ISP headquartered in Brisbane. The company offers a range of nbn® broadband services, including satellite, fixed wireless, fixed line, and business-grade Starlink solutions. Skymesh is owned by Salter Brothers, an Australian investment firm.

== History ==
Skymesh was founded in 2005 in Brisbane, Queensland, with the mission to provide reliable internet connectivity to remote and regional areas of Australia. It focused on bringing high-quality internet to areas where options were limited.

=== Timeline ===
- 2005 - Skymesh founded. The company began by rolling out its own fixed wireless network in the Gympie and Sunshine Coast regions, providing 2 Mbps services to residents not covered by Telstra’s ADSL footprint.
- 2006 - Selected as a Suncoast Broadband Preferred Supplier for wireless broadband services in blackspots of the Noosa, Maroochy, and Caloundra Shires.
- 2007 - Began offering IPSTAR satellite services nationwide, providing 4 Mbps services to residents outside fixed-line and fixed wireless footprints.
- 2011 - Started providing satellite services over nbn® co’s interim satellite network, offering 6 Mbps to residents outside fibre and fixed wireless areas.
- 2012 - Launched services over nbn® co’s fixed wireless network, initially 12 Mbps and later upgraded to 25 Mbps.
- 2014 - Assisted nbn® co in commissioning the Sky Muster satellite network, providing test services to early Skymesh customers.
- 2016 - Began offering satellite services over Sky Muster, delivering 25 Mbps to areas beyond fibre and fixed wireless coverage.
- 2017 - Acquired Bordernet, expanding regional coverage.
- 2018 - Sold fixed-line business to Superloop, focusing on regional broadband and satellite services.
- 2019- Assisted nbn® co in testing Sky Muster Plus, supplying fifty test services to Skymesh customers.
- 2020- Launched Sky Muster Plus service with unmetered data by default, plus optional data blocks to top up allowances.
- 2022 - Acquired Clear Networks and satellite customers from Uniti Group Limited, increasing total customer base to 56,000.
- 2024 - Began offering business-grade Starlink services as an authorised reseller.

=== Services ===
Skymesh provides a variety of broadband services tailored to meet the needs of residential and business customers in remote and regional Australia:

- Satellite Broadband: Utilising nbn® co’s Sky Muster satellite network, Skymesh offers reliable satellite internet services to areas beyond the reach of fixed-line infrastructure.
- Fixed Wireless: Delivering high-speed internet access to locations where traditional broadband options are unavailable, Skymesh's fixed wireless services cater to both residential and business customers.
- Fibre: For areas with access to fibre infrastructure, Skymesh provides fixed-line broadband services, ensuring stable and high-speed internet connectivity.
- Business Starlink: As an authorised reseller of SpaceX's Starlink for Business, Skymesh offers advanced satellite connectivity solutions designed to meet the demands of business operations in remote locations.

=== Awards ===
Skymesh has been recognised for its excellence in satellite broadband services, becoming one of the first providers to win a WhistleOut award category six years in a row. The company has consistently received the Best Satellite NBN Provider award, reflecting its commitment to connecting regional Australia to reliable and high-quality internet services. Skymesh has maintained a strong reputation as a leading provider of satellite internet plans.

=== In the News ===
In 2017, satellite broadband operator Ipstar was ordered by an Australian court to pay back $5.2 million to Skymesh against three separate claims. Skymesh was Ipstar's second largest ISP at that time, using Ipstar's satellite to provide broadband connections to rural Australia. Ipstar appealed but the damages were upheld.
