= .ovh =

Top-level domain

- Introduced: 2014
- TLD type: Generic top-level domain
- Status: Active
- Registry: AFNIC
- Sponsor: OVH
- Intended use: For the OVH customer community
- Actual use: Used for general purposes, mainly by OVH customers
- Registered domains: 62,149 (August 2020)
- Registration restrictions: None
- Structure: Registrations no longer permitted
- Documents: ICANN Registry Agreement
- Dispute policies: UDRP
- DNSSEC: yes

.ovh is an active generic top-level domain (gTLD) delegated to the DNS root zone on June 20, 2014. The domain is sponsored by OVHCloud, a major French telecommunications and hosting business. This top-level domain is no longer available for new domains.
