= Clear Networks =

Licensed Australian telecommunications carrier and ISP

Clear Networks Pty Ltd
- Company type: Privately held company
- Industry: Telecommunications
- Founded: Melbourne, Australia (2004)
- Headquarters: Blackburn North, Victoria, Australia
- Area served: Australia
- Services: Internet service provider; Wireless broadband; VoIP Telephony
- Website: www.skymesh.net.au/clear-broadband

Clear Networks was a licensed Australian telecommunications carrier and ISP that provided NBN Fibre, Wireless, NBN Sky Muster Satellite services, and legacy IPSTAR Satellite services. Clear Networks was headquartered in Blackburn North, Victoria. In 2022, Clear Networks was acquired by SkyMesh. In 2023, SkyMesh sold the Clear Networks infrastructure to Summit Internet.

== History ==
Clear Networks was founded in 2004 in Melbourne, Victoria as a sister company of Day3, via the acquisition of Canberra-based Regional Broadband Services (RBBS). In April 2016, Clear Networks commenced selling NBN Sky Muster Satellite services as one of seven initial resellers.
