= .pf =

Internet country code top-level domain for French Polynesia

- Introduced: 19 March 1996
- TLD type: Country code top-level domain
- Status: Active
- Registry: Office des postes et télécommunications de Polynésie française
- Sponsor: Ministère des Postes et Télécommunications
- Intended use: Entities connected with French Polynesia
- Actual use: Used in French Polynesia
- Registration restrictions: Local presence requirement
- Structure: Registrations are made directly at the second level, or within org.pf
- Documents: Rules; Registration form
- Registry website: eservices.mana.pf

.pf is the Internet country code top-level domain (ccTLD) for French Polynesia. The name pf derived from the French name of Polynésie française.

A local contact has to be appointed to register a domain name under .pf. The only 2nd level domain available for public registrations at the third level is .org.pf, but most registrations are made directly at the second level.

== Second-level domains ==
- .org.pf
- .asso.pf (reserved for duly declared associations)
- .edu.pf (reserved for educational institutions)
- .gov.pf (reserved for the Government of French Polynesia)

== See also ==
- Internet in French Polynesia
- Internet in France
- ISO 3166-2:PF
- .fr –CC TLD for the Republic of France
- .eu –CC TLD for the European Union
