= .pm =

Internet country code top-level domain for Saint Pierre and Miquelon

- Introduced: 20 August 1997
- TLD type: Country code top-level domain
- Status: Active
- Registry: AFNIC
- Sponsor: AFNIC
- Intended use: Entities connected with Saint Pierre and Miquelon
- Actual use: Sees rare use, most of which is not related to Saint Pierre and Miquelon
- Registration restrictions: Registrant must reside in the European Economic Area or in Switzerland; Domains must be 3 characters or over
- Structure: Registrations are made at second level
- DNSSEC: Yes
- Registry website: nic.pm (redirects to afnic.fr)

.pm is the country code top-level domain (ccTLD) for Saint Pierre and Miquelon. It is managed by AFNIC, with registration services opening on 6 December 2011.

As of June 2021, there are more than 7000 registered .pm domains.

== British domain holders post-Brexit ==
Since 1 January 2021, British citizens have not been able to register .pm domains. However, as AFNIC is unable to apply policies retroactively, it is allowing all registrations pre-Brexit to continue, with renewal permitted.

== Notable usage ==
- The Office of The Prime Minister of Australia owns the domain aus.pm as a short URL

== See also ==
- Internet in Saint Pierre and Miquelon
- Internet in France
- ISO 3166-2:PM
- .fr –ccTLD for the Republic of France
- .eu –ccTLD for the European Union
