= .gf =

Internet country code top-level domain for French Guiana

- Introduced: 25 July 1996
- TLD type: Country code top-level domain
- Status: Active
- Registry: DOMeNIC
- Sponsor: Canal+ Telecom
- Intended use: Entities connected with French Guiana
- Actual use: Used rarely in French Guiana, sometimes used for dating sites
- Documents: Information
- DNSSEC: No
- Registry website: DOMeNIC

.gf is the country code top-level domain (ccTLD) for French Guiana. It is delegated to the ISP Canal+ Telecom.

== See also ==
- Internet in France
- ISO 3166-2:GF
- .fr –CC TLD for France
- .eu –CC TLD for the European Union
