= .yt =

Internet country code top-level domain for Mayotte

- Introduced: 17 November 1997
- TLD type: Country code top-level domain
- Status: Active, accepting registrations
- Registry: AFNIC
- Sponsor: AFNIC
- Intended use: Entities connected with Mayotte
- Actual use: Rarely used; occasionally registered by people or organisations connected with YouTube
- Registration restrictions: Registrant must be based in a European Union member state, Iceland, Liechtenstein, Norway, Switzerland
- Structure: Registrations are taken at the second level
- DNSSEC: Yes
- Registry website: https://www.afnic.fr

.yt is the country code top-level domain (ccTLD) assigned to Mayotte, an overseas department of France. The domain is administered by the French Network Information Centre (AFNIC). Registrations under .yt were opened to the public in December 2011 following administration by AFNIC.

Since "YT" is a common abbreviation for YouTube, the domain has also seen use outside Mayotte by websites and profiles associated with YouTube content creators.

== See also ==
- Internet in Mayotte
- Internet in France
- ISO 3166-2:YT
- .fr –CC TLD for the French Republic
- .eu –CC TLD for the European Union
