= .nc =

Internet country code top-level domain for New Caledonia

- Introduced: 13 October 1993
- TLD type: Country code top-level domain
- Status: Active
- Registry: Office des Postes et Telecommunications
- Sponsor: Office des Postes et Telecommunications
- Intended use: Entities connected with New Caledonia
- Actual use: Gets some use in New Caledonia, and rarely North Carolina
- Registered domains: 6,706 (2022-12-24)
- Registration restrictions: Must be a registered company or organization in New Caledonia with a local contact; individuals are not eligible to register domains. Some words are prohibited.
- Structure: Registrations are made directly at the second level, or at the third level beneath the .asso.nc 2LD
- Documents: Rules
- Dispute policies: The registry encourages compromises between disputing parties but otherwise stays out of disputes
- DNSSEC: yes
- Registry website: Domain registration

.nc is the Internet country code top-level domain (ccTLD) for New Caledonia. Registry operations are managed by the Office des postes et télécommunications.

== Restrictions ==
Only New Caledonian registered companies or associations, or private individuals who are resident in New Caledonia are permitted to register .nc domain names.

Many generic terms are prohibited from registration (those linked with crimes); there are also many reserved for particular circumstances. These include "administration", "bible", "blog", "cabinets", "colonisation", "flag", "justice", "mail", "nation", "offense", "outrage", "presses", "registries", "temple", "union", "vote" and hundreds more.

== Structure ==
Registrations are taken directly at the second level, or at the third level under two second-level domains.

- .asso.nc
- .nom.nc

== See also ==
- Internet in New Caledonia
- Internet in France
- ISO 3166-2:NC
- .fr –CC TLD for France
- .eu –CC TLD for the members of the European Union
