= .fr =

Top-level Internet domain for France

- Introduced: September 2, 1986; 40 years ago
- TLD type: Country code top-level domain
- Status: Active
- Registry: AFNIC
- Sponsor: AFNIC
- Intended use: Entities connected with France
- Actual use: Very popular in France
- Registered domains: 4.545.963 (14 August 2026)
- Registration restrictions: Restricted to residents of the European Union, Switzerland, Norway, Iceland or Liechtenstein
- Documents: Registration Agreement
- Dispute policies: Alternative Dispute Resolutions
- DNSSEC: Yes
- Registry website: AFNIC

.fr is the Internet country code top-level domain (ccTLD) in the Domain Name System of the Internet for France administered by the AFNIC.

== Requirements ==
In order to purchase and use a .fr domain, they must be a resident of the European Union or an EFTA member state (Switzerland, Norway, Iceland or Liechtenstein).

=== British restrictions ===
Due to the United Kingdom's withdrawal from the European Union, since 1 January 2021 UK residents are not able to register new .fr domains. However, the AFNIC has stated that all domains registered before 31 December 2020 by Britons will not be affected.

== Registration ==
The domain includes all individuals and organizations registered at the Association française pour le nommage Internet en coopération (AFNIC).

Since 2004, websites registered with the .fr domain are archived and preserved by the Bibliothèque nationale de France.

=== Other domains under French administration ===
Domain	Territory
.bl	Saint Barthélemy
.gf	French Guiana
.gp	Guadeloupe
.mf	Saint Martin
.mq	Martinique
.nc	New Caledonia
.pf	French Polynesia
.pm	Saint Pierre and Miquelon
.re	Réunion
.tf	French Southern Territories
.yt	Mayotte

== See also ==
- Internet in France
- .eu: CC TLD for the European Union
- .paris
- .bzh
