= Oleane =

French internet provider

Oleane was one of the first ISPs in France, created in 1989, from UUCP technology. First connected to PSINet, with Telebit modems, international connectivity moved to UUNet in 1991.

Real IP connections arrived in 1992, with a direct PIPEX (UK) 64 kbit/s link and Cisco AGS+.

Oleane was created by Jean-Michel Planche, with the help of Marie-Véronique Lacaze, Paul Rolland, Jean-Pierre Le Couedic, Christophe Wolfhugel and Benoit Grangé.

Oleane was the First Internet Operator in France, dedicated to Enterprise market, with more than 2,900 customers and a double turnover each year since its creation. (1996: 23 million, 1997: 48 million and will expect +100 million in 1998)

Oleane was sold in March 1998 to France Telecom (now Orange) to form with Transpac, FTH (France Telecom Hébergement) and few other divisions the DATA Professional Division of the group. With the fusion of Oleane and Transpac offer, Oleane ceased to exist as an independent IP services provider around June 2006.
