= Aquarelle.com Group =

French e-commerce company

The Aquarelle.com Group is a French E-commerce company specializing in flower delivery. Based in the Paris suburb of Levallois-Perret, the organization is privately owned and led by the founders, Henri and François de Maublanc.

Logo of Aquarelle

== Overview ==
In 1987, brothers Henri de Maublanc and François de Maublanc opened the first Aquarelle flower shop in Paris. Over the next 10 years, they built up a network of 22 fully owned shops throughout France. In 1997, the brothers launched Aquarelle.com as an online flower delivery service. Unlike other similar flower delivery services such as Fleurop-Interflora who rely on local florists for the design and delivery of the flowers, the Aquarelle company designs and makes its own compositions in its workshops in Brasseuse and use the French express postal service for delivery. Today, the Aquarelle.com Group employs around 120 people and their online activities have almost completely displaced the offline business. Of the 22 shops in place at their peak, only the Paris and Rennes shops remain.

== Activities ==
Initially specializing in flowery delivery, Aquarelle began expanding its range in 2005:

- Flowers (since 1997)
- Flowers and chocolates (since 2005)
- Flowers and gift boxes (since 2009)
- Flowers and scented candles (since 2012)

== Fair trade ==
Since 12 April 2016, alongside Système U, the roses delivered by Aquarelle.com in France are certified Fair trade/Max Havelaar.
