= Internet in France =

Internet in France has been available to the general public since 1994, but widespread Internet use did not take off until the mid-2000s. As of 31 December 2014, France had 26 million Internet broadband and high-speed connections on fixed networks. In 2014, 80.7% of French households (22.5 million households) had Internet access (47 million users in January 2015, according to Médiamétrie), while 19.3% did not (5.4 million households, out of a total of 27.8 million households).

In 2014, 82% of French people aged 12 and over had Internet access at home (even though only 77% used it), and 64% of French people aged 12 years and older connected daily to the Internet from home. Considering all connections locations (not only the home), 83% of French people were Internet users.

In metropolitan France, intense competition between Internet service providers has led to the introduction of moderately-priced high speed ADSL up to 28 Mbit/s (ATM), VDSL2 up to 100 Mbit/s, and FTTX up to 1 Gbit/s from €26 per month. They often include other services such as unlimited free VoIP telephone communications to land lines, and digital television. Dial-up internet access is considered outdated.

Since around 2003, quotas have been seen as outdated and consequently all the fixed broadband internet offers in France are unmetered.

== History ==
The PTT pioneered the virtual circuit variant of packet switching beginning in 1971 through the work of Rémi Després at CNET. Després demonstrated the technology on the experimental RCP network. Virtual circuits became part of the X.25 standard used on Transpac and public data networks worldwide. Many public networks later switched to the Internet protocol suite and became part of the Internet.

The CYCLADES research project was directed by Louis Pouzin at the IRIA (later, INRIA) beginning in 1972. The Internet protocol suite (TCP/IP) incorporates concepts first implemented in this network.

Public dialup information, messaging and e-commerce services, were pioneered through Minitel, launched in 1982, which provided videotex, information and services, for users in their homes. Minitel was the world's most successful online service prior to the World Wide Web.

FNET, the French branch of EUnet, converted from UUCP to TCP/IP in 1986.

During the summer of 1988, the INRIA connected its Sophia-Antipolis unit to the NSFNet via Princeton using a satellite link leased to France Telecom and MCI. The link became operational on 8 August 1988, and allowed INRIA researchers to access the US network and allowed NASA researchers access to an astronomical database based in Strasbourg. This was the first international connection to NSFNET and the first time that French networks were connected directly to a network using TCP/IP, the Internet protocol.

In 1992, almost simultaneously, French Data Network and Altern (via the Minitel service 3616 ALTERN) enabled the general public to connect to the Internet. Access to the World Wide Web did not yet exist at the time and the services offered were email, the news of the Usenet network, access to many software archives documentation, and access to Internet network machines.

RENATER was the first network for research and higher education in France to use the Internet protocol suite in 1993. Initially, the Internet was only available to a small number of users in a few companies and universities.

AOL was a success in France between 1996 and 2000 through its widely distributed free CDs, with attractive prices for low speeds.

The general public began to have access to Internet starting from 1994. The first real public Internet service provider (ISP) was WorldNet which opened in February 1994 at the Computer Associates Expo. FranceNet, founded by Rafi Haladjian, launched its service in June 1994. These were followed by order Calvacom, Internet Way and Imaginet. Internet access became widespread in the early 2000s with the emergence of ADSL.

In 2007, Free was one of the first ISPs in the world to deploy IPv6 service using the 6rd mechanism invented by Rémi Després, although Nerim had been the first French ISP to offer IPv6 connectivity to their ADSL users in March 2003.

== Lines ==
On 3 December 2008, France had 16.3 million broadband connections, of which 94% are ADSL subscribers. This makes France the second largest ADSL market in Europe. At the end of 2005, 30% of those DSL lines were unbundled, and 37% of those unbundled lines were totally unbundled without any direct invoicing of the historical operator and a greater progression rate than partial unbundling. At the end of September 2005, more than 95% of the population can have a DSL connection, albeit some of them only 512/128.

=== "Zones Blanches" in France ===
Over 100,000 households in rural areas are unable to be reached for ADSL connection, and must access Internet through other means, such Satellite Internet. These are known as "zone blanches", or dead zones.

To reduce the digital divide, many departments have chosen either to subsidize Internet access via satellite, or to deploy radio networks, such as WiMax. The French state has also chosen to subsidize some private operators to enable them to deploy fiber optics throughout the country.

== Domain Names in France ==
The AFNIC is responsible for domain names in France, including .fr (France and the island of Réunion) and .pm (for Saint Pierre and Miquelon).

Other domain names exist, such as .gf for French Guiana, .nc for New Caledonia, .mq for Martinique, .yt for Mayotte, .pf for French Polynesia, .gp for Guadeloupe, .tf for French Southern and Antarctic Lands or .eu for the European Union.

== ADSL market ==
Consumer access to digital networks started in France earlier than in other countries with the Minitel, a pre-World Wide Web online service invented by the PTT (Postes, Télégraphes et Téléphones). By 1997, Minitel was installed in nine million households around France with an estimated 25 million users.

France seeks to reach universal broadband coverage by 2017.

=== ADSL Market Actors ===
Of 25 million subscribers, the major Internet service providers (ISPs) in France are:

- Orange 40% market share, or 10.354 million subscribers as of 31 December 2014.
- Free (group Iliad) (also including Alice): 5.868 million subscribers.
- SFR - Numericable: 6.577 million subscribers.
- Bouygues Telecom (group Bouygues): 2.428 million subscribers.
- Other (Alsatis NordNet, OVH Telecom, Prixtel, Budget Telecom, Coriolis Telecom, Vivéole (now Bigblu), FDN, Nerim, ... Magic OnLine): 6.57% or 1.27 million subscribers.

The legal context in France allows associations to form themselves into non-profit ISP. There are well over a dozen such ISPs associations in France, the main one being the French Data Network and a federation of associative internet providers, the Federation FDN.

== ADSL offers ==
The market is oriented towards stopping the price war, and offering more services at a price going from €20 to €38:

- maximum throughput permitted by the line, either 24 Mbit/s (maximum of ADSL2+), 28 Mbit/s (Broadcom non-standard ADSL2+ deployed on Free network) or 100 Mbit/s (maximum of VDSL2 profile 17a) depending on the line length and type of DSLAM.
- unlimited telephony to land lines in Europe, North America (even mobile phones), and a few dozens of other countries.
- television with the broadcasting of the young terrestrial digital TV and paid satellite TV.

Those triple play offers were initiated by Free with the Freebox modem, and are expanding to all major players, driving the French market.

Bouygues Telecom lowered the first price of standard triple-play offers to €20 in February 2015. Those prices are being attained with complete unbundling, saving the monthly €15 for the POTS subscription while retaining the triple play services. Those offers of naked DSL are also available in non-unbundled areas, and can lead to the economy of the traditional telephone subscription.

== ADSL technology ==
After selling the first ADSL2+ offers in Europe, providing a speed of 18 Mbit/s down and 1 Mbit/s up in 2004, French operators continue to offer new services, driven by the competition. It is possible to use videotelephony, video on demand, Reach Extended ADSL for 8 km lines soon. Experiments are not any more the Iliad/Free trademark: they recently demonstrated an aggregated 174 Mbit/s link, while Telecom Italia innovates on the service with a free hotline and Orange is pushing VDSL.

In December 2005, Free enabled a TV multicasting service on the customer's local network, an open solution based on RTSP. This completes the media center capability of the freebox, also using the VideoLAN project. They launched in April 2006 a new Freebox divided in two devices with DVB-T and HDTV capabilities and a Mimo WiFi network.

Quadruple play, triple play with mobile communications, is available.

Around 2007, fixed broadband operators experimented dual mode mobile offers, such as Neuf Cegetel selling for €200 and €1 along with its Twin plan, a GSM/WiFi hybrid telephone after the experimental beautifulphone, by the means of a QTek 8300 and Wanadoo selling Unik, a Motorola, Nokia or Samsung handset for €100. These offers have not been widely taken up by consumers and ceased operating a few years later.

== Other Technologies ==
France has seen the development of other types of networks applications, such as Sigfox's "ultra narrow band" radio network, covering of up to 80% of the country in 2012. Bosch, and other companies such as Ericsson and Cisco Systems have created similar connective applications, with Bosch having sold over 50 thousand networked heating systems in the country as of 2015. Sigfox and French companies, SYSMECA and Airbus, are partnering to embark on the “MUSTANG Project”, a drive to offer both earth- and satellite-based Machine to Machine communication worldwide. They are partly publicly funded, with the French Future Investments Programme, through the Agence Nationale de la Recherche.

== Anti-piracy law ==
In May 2009, a bill was approved by the French National Assembly to prevent internet piracy. After being caught at downloading illegal files three times, a user's connection might be suspended. It only targets open peer-to-peer file sharing networks.

== See also ==
- .fr
- Telephone numbers in France
- International Network Working Group
