= Former Australian dialling codes =

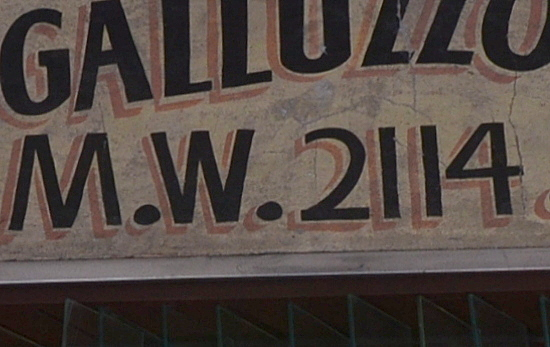
Four-digit telephone number in Glebe, New South Wales, in the 1950s

The format of telephone numbers in Australia has changed over time to allow for the expansion of the subscriber base as technology has improved.

== Introduction of area codes (pre-1990s) ==
The introduction of subscriber trunk dialling was slow, partly because of the distances of exchanges in some areas and partly due to the use of manual exchanges well into the 1980s. Initially, dialing codes covered a very small area, sometimes only one exchange, but gradually exchanges conglomerated to become large area codes. The length of codes varied; as early as 1971, some localities had area codes as long as seven digits, while the state capitals had two-digit area codes. By 1989, the system had been standardised to three-digit codes across the board, with two digit codes in the major cities. Only Kangaroo Island retained its four-digit code.

The digit following the leading zero was chosen to represent a rough geographic area, with the following numbers:

- 00: Tasmania (but also used for emergency (000), freecall (008), premium rate (0055), international access (0011) and other special numbers)
- 01: Mobile phone, pager, information and operator services
- 02: Sydney
- 03: Melbourne
- 04: New South Wales regional areas roughly within 250 km of Sydney (from 1992 041x was/is used for GSM mobile phones)
- 05: Victoria regional areas and South Western New South Wales Murray River border areas downstream of Rutherglen
- 06: Australian Capital Territory, New South Wales regional areas outside the 04 codes and some far North Eastern parts of Victoria.
- 07: Queensland
- 08: South Australia and the Northern Territory
- 09: Western Australia, Christmas Island (Note: Until 1994, these territories were not part of the Australian numbering plan, and instead used the code +672, for the Australian External Territories of Norfolk Island and the Australian Antarctic Territory. Numbers in use before 1994 are now in the number ranges of 08 9162 for Christmas Island and 08 9164 for the Cocos Keeling Islands, but other ranges are now used on the islands (at least in theory). The original phone number formats for the islands were +672 2 xxxx for Christmas Island and +672 4 xxxx for the Cocos Islands.) and the Cocos Keeling Islands

By 1994, there were six area codes of two digits covering Sydney (02), Melbourne (03), Canberra (06), Brisbane (07), Adelaide (08) and Perth (09), 48 area codes of three digits, from (002) covering Hobart to (099) covering mid-west Western Australia, and one area code of four digits, Kangaroo Island (0848), which was not incorporated into a larger area code before 1994.

To dial these numbers from overseas, one omitted the leading zero. In the case of numbers in the 00 range, only the first zero was omitted: Hobart was +61 02 xx xxxx – this was a potential cause of confusion with the Sydney area code (+61 2 xxx xxxx or +61 2 xx xxxx). The 007 range was used for satellite phones and "0G" mobile phones. Even as late as 2005 there was confusion: the prefixes +61 78 and +61 79 were listed as a "mobile phone number" on some call rates, even though the prefix was +61 07x and had not been used for over a decade.

In late March 1990, Canberra's area code changed from (062) to (06) by integrating the 2 into the subscriber number, thus allowing 200 000 more numbers to be registered.

In the 1950s-1960s the telephone number was a two letter alphabetic exchange code followed by a 4 digit number. The Australian letter-to-number mapping was A=1, B=2, F=3, J=4, L=5, M=6, U=7, W=8, X=9, Y=0 (refer Rotary dial ).

Example telephone number in Sydney
1950s–1960s	Alphabetical exchange codes	MW 2114
Mid 1960s	Numeric exchange codes	68 2114
1960s–1971	All-digit dialling and conversion to seven digits	660 2114
1971–1996	STD codes introduced	02-660 2114
1996–present	Area code restructuring	(02) 9660 2114

== Renumbering (1994–1998) ==
In Australia, as in other countries, due to the increase in subscriber uptake of services such as extra telephone lines in homes, mobile phones and other services, the previous numbering plan was being stretched to its limit. It was decided to reduce the number of area codes and lengthen all subscriber numbers by one or two digits. This occurred between 1994 and 1998, and was done progressively to ensure as little inconvenience and confusion as possible. The gradual change was also to avoid number clashes, a situation where two subscribers in two completely different locations have technically the same telephone number if dialed in their entirety. The first numbers to be converted to eight digits were numbers in the 99x xxxx and 99 xxxx ranges in the suburb of Mona Vale in Sydney, which all became 999x xxxx or 9999 xxxx on 25 July 1994. The final codes changed to eight digits were the Queensland (070), (071), (076), (077) and (079) codes, which all changed to (07) 4yxx xxxx on 10 November 1997.

In almost all cases, the former area code was incorporated into the new subscriber number: Canberra numbers went from (06) 2xx xxxx to (02) 62xx xxxx, numbers in the Northern Territory went from (089) xx xxxx to (08) 89xx xxxx, Regional Victoria went from 05x xxx xxx to 03 5xxx xxxx and so on. The four major exceptions were the two cities of Sydney and Melbourne, which added a 9 to the beginning of subscriber numbers; Tasmania, which became part of the (03) 6xxx xxxx range; and Queensland, which spread its area codes across a wide number range so that (07) 3... covers Brisbane, (07) 5... covers the surrounds including Esk and the Gold and Sunshine coasts, and (07) 4... covers the rest of the state. In Melbourne and Sydney, new non-geographic 90xx xxxx and 91xx xxxx ranges became available. Canberra also got a new 61xx xxxx range. Until November 1998, the only mobile numbers available were in the 040x and 041x ranges, to allow time for the existing 04x area codes (then New South Wales regional codes) to be converted to (02) 4xxx xxxx numbers.

During the period of changeover, Australians were often told they were required to dial the entire telephone number they were calling, including the area code, even though the number may have been within the same area code. For example, a caller in Sydney with the number (02) 9xxx xxxx would need to dial (02) 49xx xxxx to call a number in Newcastle, despite the area code being the same. This was in order to avoid possible number clashes. Although this practice officially ceased on 1 March 1999, many still believe they are required to dial an area code outside their own telephone book area, but this is not the case.

Area Code boundaries do not always follow state boundaries, Along the Murray River New South Wales / Victoria state boundary 02 stretches south into Victoria for up to 50 km upstream of Rutherglen while 03 a similar distance north into New South Wales downstream of Rutherglen. Broken Hill has an Area Code of 08 despite being geographically in New South Wales.

== Former area codes and systems of change ==
Note: the number ranges given below do not include all current numbers in a given area. See the Australian telephone numbering plan for more information.

Former number	Current number	Date of change	Location of area code
(002) xx xxxx	(03) 62xx xxxx	1996-08-19	Hobart & Southern Tasmania
(003) xx xxxx	(03) 63xx xxxx	1996-08-19	Launceston & North East Tasmania
(004) xx xxxx	(03) 64xx xxxx	1996-08-19	Burnie, Devonport, North West & West Coast of Tasmania
0055 xxxxx	1900 9xx xxx 1902 2xx xxx	Pre 1999	Premium numbers
007 1xx xxx	0147 1xx xxx	March 1999	Satellite telephone numbers
008 xxx xxx	1800 xxx xxx	1990s	Toll-free numbers
01z xxx xxx	041z xxx xxx	1992	Mobile telephone numbers (Digital GSM numbers starts with 041z while Analogue AMPS numbers had started with 01z)
(02) 99x xxxx	(02) 999x xxxx	1994-07-25	Mona Vale (Sydney)
(02) 99 xxxx	(02) 9999 xxxx	1994-07-25	Mona Vale (Sydney)
(02) 9xx xxxx	(02) 99xx xxxx	1995-07-24	Sydney
(02) xxx xxxx	(02) 9xxx xxxx	1996-07-29	Sydney
(02) xx xxxx	(02) 91xx xxxx	1996-07-29	Sydney
(03) xxx xxxx	(03) 9xxx xxxx	1995-05-08	Melbourne
(042) xx xxxx	(02) 42xx xxxx	1997-08-18	Wollongong
(043) xx xxxx	(02) 43xx xxxx	1997-08-18	Central Coast, Gosford
(044) xx xxxx	(02) 44xx xxxx	1997-08-18	Batemans Bay, Moruya, Narooma, Nowra, Ulladulla
(045) xx xxxx	(02) 45xx xxxx	1997-08-18	Richmond, Windsor
(046) xx xxxx	(02) 46xx xxxx	1997-08-18	Camden, Campbelltown, Picton
(047) xx xxxx	(02) 47xx xxxx	1997-08-18	Katoomba, Penrith, Springwood
(048) xx xxxx	(02) 48xx xxxx	1997-08-18	Bowral, Braidwood, Crookwell, Goulburn, Mittagong, Moss Vale
(049) xx xxxx	(02) 49xx xxxx	1997-08-18	Cessnock, Maitland, Newcastle
(050) xx xxxx	(03) 50xx xxxx	1996-11-11	Balranald, Hopetoun, Mildura, Ouyen, Swan Hill
(051) xx xxxx	(03) 51xx xxxx	1996-11-11	Bairnsdale, Moe, Morwell, Sale, Traralgon
(052) xx xxxx	(03) 52xx xxxx	1996-11-11	Colac, Geelong
(053) xx xxxx	(03) 53xx xxxx	1996-11-11	Ararat, Bacchus Marsh, Ballarat, Horsham, Nhill, Stawell
(054) xx xxxx	(03) 54xx xxxx	1996-11-11	Bendigo, Castlemaine, Charlton, Echuca, Kerang, Kyneton, Maryborough
(055) xx xxxx	(03) 55xx xxxx	1996-11-11	Camperdown, Casterton, Edenhope, Hamilton, Portland, Warrnambool
(056) xx xxxx	(03) 56xx xxxx	1996-11-11	Foster, Korumburra, Leongatha, Warragul, Wonthaggi
(057) xx xxxx	(03) 57xx xxxx	1996-11-11	Alexandra, Benalla, Myrtleford, Seymour, Wangaratta
(058) xx xxxx	(03) 58xx xxxx	1996-11-11	Cobram, Deniliquin, Numurkah, Shepparton
(059) xx xxxx	(03) 59xx xxxx	1996-11-11	Cranbourne, Healesville, Mornington
(06) 2xx xxxx (Note: The Canberra area code was formerly (062) but, due to demand, the 2 was incorporated into the subscriber number in the week of 21–28 March 1990. Despite this, the area code was still listed as (062) in some areas before the change to eight digits. Between 1990 and 1997, Canberra local numbers were only available in the form 2xx xxxx so that outside dialling could not clash with other area codes.)	(02) 62xx xxxx	1997-08-18	Canberra, Queanbeyan, Yass
(060) xx xxxx	(02) 60xx xxxx	1997-08-18	Albury, Corowa, Corryong, Holbrook, Wodonga
(063) xx xxxx	(02) 63xx xxxx	1997-08-18	Bathurst, Cowra, Lithgow, Mudgee, Orange, Rylstone, Young
(064) xx xxxx	(02) 64xx xxxx	1997-08-18	Bega, Berridale, Bombala, Cooma, Eden, Jindabyne, Merimbula, Snowy Mountains
(065) xx xxxx	(02) 65xx xxxx	1997-08-18	Forster, Gloucester, Kempsey, Lord Howe Island, Muswellbrook, Nambucca, Port Macquarie, Scone, Singleton, Taree, Wauchope
(066) xx xxxx	(02) 66xx xxxx	1997-08-18	Ballina, Casino, Coffs Harbour, Grafton, Lismore, Murwillumbah
(067) xx xxxx	(02) 67xx xxxx	1997-08-18	Armidale, Glen Innes, Gunnedah, Inverell, Moree, Narrabri, Tamworth
(068) xx xxxx	(02) 68xx xxxx	1997-08-18	Cobar, Condobolin, Dubbo, Forbes, Parkes, Wellington
(069) xx xxxx	(02) 69xx xxxx	1997-08-18	Cootamundra, Griffith, Hay, Leeton, Narrandera, Temora, Tumut, Wagga Wagga, West Wyalong
(07) xxx xxxx (Note: Brisbane local numbers were only available in the forms 2xx xxxx, 3xx xxxx or 8xx xxxx so that outside dialling could not clash with other area codes.)	(07) 3xxx xxxx	1995-07-17	Brisbane
(070) xx xxxx	(07) 40xx xxxx	1997-11-10	Cairns
(071) xx xxxx	(07) 41xx xxxx	1997-11-10	Bundaberg, Gayndah, Hervey Bay, Kingaroy, Maryborough, Murgon
(074) xx xxxx	(07) 54xx xxxx	1996-10-07	Boonah, Caboolture, Esk, Gatton, Gympie, Sunshine Coast
(075) xx xxxx	(07) 55xx xxxx	1995-06-05	Beaudesert, Gold Coast, Tweed Heads, Coolangatta
(076) xx xxxx	(07) 46xx xxxx	1997-11-10	Toowoomba, Charleville, Dalby, Dirranbandi, Goondiwindi, Inglewood, Longreach, Miles, Roma, St George, Stanthorpe, Warwick
(077) xx xxxx	(07) 47xx xxxx	1997-11-10	Townsville, Cloncurry, Hughenden, Mount Isa
(079) xx xxxx	(07) 49xx xxxx	1997-11-10	Rockhampton, Emerald, Gladstone, Mackay
(08) xxx xxxx (Note: Adelaide local numbers were only available in the forms 2xx xxxx, 3xx xxxx, 3x xxxx, 4xx xxxx or 4x xxxx so that outside dialling could not clash with other area codes.)	(08) 8xxx xxxx	1996-08-19	Adelaide
(08) xx xxxx	(08) 84xx xxxx	1996-08-19	Adelaide
(080) xx xxxx	(08) 80xx xxxx	1997-02-03	Broken Hill
(0848) xxxxx	(08) 855x xxxx (See below)	1997-02-03	Kangaroo Island
(085) xx xxxx	(08) 85xx xxxx	1997-02-03	Barossa Valley, Riverland
(086) xx xxxx	(08) 86xx xxxx	1997-02-03	Ceduna, Eyre Peninsula, Port Augusta, Port Pirie, Whyalla
(087) xx xxxx	(08) 87xx xxxx	1997-02-03	Mount Gambier, Naracoorte
(088) xx xxxx	(08) 88xx xxxx	1995-02-13	Clare, Kadina, Yorke Peninsula
(089) xx xxxx	(08) 89xx xxxx	1996-05-06	Northern Territory
(09) xxx xxxx (Note: Perth local numbers were only available in the forms 2xx xxxx, 3xx xxxx, 4xx xxxx or 5xx xxxx so that outside dialling could not clash with other area codes.)	(08) 9xxx xxxx	1997-05-05	Perth
(090) xx xxxx	(08) 90xx xxxx	1997-05-05	Esperance, Kalgoorlie, Merredin
(091) xx xxxx	(08) 91xx xxxx	1997-05-05	Broome, Christmas Island, Cocos (Keeling) Islands, Derby, Port Hedland
(095) xx xxxx	(08) 95xx xxxx	1997-05-05	Bullsbrook, Mandurah, Pinjarra, Rockingham
(096) xx xxxx	(08) 96xx xxxx	1997-05-05	Moora, Northam, York
(097) xx xxxx	(08) 97xx xxxx	1997-05-05	Bridgetown, Bunbury, Busselton
(098) xx xxxx	(08) 98xx xxxx	1997-05-05	Albany, Katanning, Narrogin, Wagin
(099) xx xxxx	(08) 99xx xxxx	1997-05-05	Carnarvon, Geraldton, Meekatharra, Mullewa

=== Minor changes ===
The South Eastern New South Wales corner had previously been split into two area code regions each with four digits, (0648) and (0649). These were centred on Cooma and the Snowy Mountains region and Bega and the Far South Coast region, respectively. The regions only had 5 digit (xxxxx) local numbers until they were upgraded and the numbers were changed to 6 digits. This resulted in the numbers becoming (064) 5xxxxx for Cooma/Snowy Mountains region and (064) 9xxxxx for Bega/Far South Coast region. When phone numbers were changed to 8 digits these two regions became (02) 64xxxxxx numbers.

Kangaroo Island was the only area in Australia that was not integrated into a larger area code before the change to eight-digit phone numbering, and had the only four-digit area code, (0848). The Kangaroo Island area was incorporated into the (08) 855x xxxx number range with a significant change to subscriber numbers (for example (0848) 21000 became (08) 8553 4000).

Old number	Town	New number
(0848) 21xxx	Kingscote	(08) 8553 4xxx
(0848) 22xxx	Kingscote	(08) 8553 2xxx
(0848) 23xxx	Kingscote	(08) 8553 3xxx
(0848) 24xxx	Kingscote	(08) 8553 0xxx
(0848) 28xxx	Macgillivray	(08) 8553 8xxx
(0848) 29xxx	Cygnet River	(08) 8553 9xxx
(0848) 31xxx	Penneshaw	(08) 8553 1xxx
(0848) 33xxx	American River	(08) 8553 7xxx
(0848) 35xxx	Wisanger	(08) 8553 5xxx
(0848) 36xxx	Stokes Bay	(08) 8559 2xxx
(0848) 37xxx	Karatta	(08) 8559 7xxx
(0848) 93xxx	Gosse	(08) 8559 3xxx
(0848) 94xxx	Harriet	(08) 8559 4xxx
(0848) 96xxx	Parndana	(08) 8559 6xxx
(0848) 97xxx	Parndana	(08) 8559 5xxx

In order to prevent incorrect connections during the changeover period, a number which would otherwise have the first digits of its old form the same as the first digits of its new form had to be changed. For example, (043) 43 2123 may be confused with (02) 4321 2345 (which would be used for (043) 21 2345) during the change. To prevent this, before the change to eight digits, the local number was changed, so that, in the example, (043) 43 2123 would become (043) 44 2123, and then (02) 4344 2123. A list of all numbers changed in this way is shown in the table below.

Old number	New number	Date of change	Affected towns
(062) xx xxxx	(06) 2xx xxxx	1990–03	Canberra, Queanbeyan, Yass
+672 2 xxxx	(091) 62 xxxx	1994-10-02	Christmas Island
+672 4 xxxx	(091) 64 xxxx	1994-10-02	Cocos (Keeling) Islands
(002) 62 xxxx	(002) 60 xxxx	1994-11-07	Richmond, Campania
(003) 63 xxxx	(003) 67 xxxx	1995-01-09	Chudleigh, Caveside
(02) 9xx xxxx	(02) 99xx xxxx	1995-07-24	
(043) 43 xxxx	(043) 44 xxxx	1996-02-19	Woy Woy
(046) 46 xxxx	(046) 48 xxxx	1996-02-19	Narellan
(048) 48 xxxx	(048) 44 xxxx	1996-02-19	Roslyn, Bannister, Bungonia, Windellama, Quialigo
(049) 49 xxxx	(049) 44 xxxx	1996-02-19	Dudley
(051) 51 xxxx	(051) 54 xxxx	1995-03-13	Orbost
(052) 52 xxxx	(052) 58 xxxx	1995-03-20	Queenscliff
(053) 53 xxxx	(053) 54 xxxx	1995-02-20	Willaura, Moyston, Elmhurst, Crowlands
(054) 54 xxxx	(054) 57 xxxx	1995-03-13	Myall, Murrabit, Mystic Park, Benjeroop, Appin South, Lake Meran
(056) 56 xxxx	(056) 58 xxxx	1995-04-10	Korumburra
(057) 57 xxxx	(057) 54 xxxx	1995-02-06	Mount Beauty, Coral Bank
(058) 58 xxxx	(058) 52 xxxx	1995-03-06	Tongala
(063) 63 xxxx	(063) 60 xxxx	1996-02-19	Orange
(065) 65 xxxx	(065) 67 xxxx	1996-02-19	Smithtown, Hat Head
(066) 66 xxxx	(066) 61 xxxx	1996-02-19	Tabulam South, Rappville, Myrtle Creek, Whiporie
(067) 67 xxxx	(067) 60 xxxx	1996-02-19	Tamworth, Bithramere, Kootingal, Winton, Westdale, Hallsville, Nemingha
(068) 68 xxxx	(068) 64 xxxx	1996-02-19	Yarrabandai
(069) 69 xxxx	(069) 60 xxxx	1996-02-19	Griffith
(085) 85 xxxx	(085) 95 xxxx	1995-02-27	Renmark, Berri, Paringa, Taldra, Cooltong, Murtho, Loxton
(086) 86 xxxx	(086) 76 xxxx	1995-02-20	Cummins, Edillilie, Yeelanna, Karkoo, Brooker, Cockaleechie
(089) 89 xxxx	(089) 99 xxxx	1996-04-24	Darwin, Northern Territory
(097) 97 2xxx	(097) 97 0xxx	1996-02-19	Australind

== See also ==
- Telephone numbers in Australia
