= Meering West =

- Town
- Coordinates: 35°53′7″S 143°42′27″E
- Country: Australia
- State: Victoria
- LGAs: Shire of Gannawarra; Shire of Loddon

Government
  - State electorate: Murray Plains
  - Federal division: Mallee
- Postcode: 3579

Meering West is a locality in the Shire of Loddon and the Shire of Gannawarra, Victoria, Australia. At the 2021 census, Meering West had "no people or a very low population".
