= List of places on the Victorian Heritage Register in the Shire of Gannawarra =

This is a list of places on the Victorian Heritage Register in the Shire of Gannawarra in Victoria, Australia. The Victorian Heritage Register is maintained by the Heritage Council of Victoria.

The Victorian Heritage Register, as of 2021, lists the following four state-registered places within the Shire of Gannawarra:

Place name	Place #	Location	Suburb or Town	Co-ordinates	Built	State registered	Photo
Bael Bael Homestead	H2196	Lake Charm-Quambatook Road	Bael Bael	35.689690°S 143.722850°E	c. 1870s	13 February 2009	
Barham-Koondrook Bridge	H0795	Kerang-Koondrook Road over the Murray River	Koondrook	35.630473°S 144.124861°E	1903	10 July 2008	
Condidorios Bridge	H1799	Island Road over Gunbower Creek	Koondrook	35.650200°S 144.133580°E	1906	22 April 1999	
Koondrook Tram Complex	H1570	Main Street; Kerang-Koondrook Road	Koondrook; Teal Point	35.642060°S 144.131350°E; 35.663400°S 144.099425°E; 35.678743°S 144.067794°E; 35.689831°S 144.053824°E	1889	20 August 1982	
