= Keely, Victoria =

Keely Victoria
- Coordinates: 35°51′14″S 144°15′11″E
- Population: 60 (2016 census)
- Postcode(s): 3568
- Location: 271 km (168 mi) NW of Melbourne
- LGA(s): Shire of Gannawarra
- State electorate(s): Murray Plains
- Federal division(s): Mallee

Keely is a locality situated in Victoria, Australia. The locality is located in the Shire of Gannawarra local government area, 271 kilometres (168 mi) north west of the state capital, Melbourne. At the 2016 census, Keely had a population of 60.
