= Kerang East =

- Town
- Coordinates: 35°46′24″S 144°1′3″E
- Country: Australia
- State: Victoria
- LGA: Shire of Gannawarra
- Location: 289 km (180 mi) NW of Melbourne

Government
  - State electorate: Murray Plains
  - Federal division: Mallee

Population
  - Total: 40 (2016 census)
- Time zone: UTC+10
  - Summer (DST): UTC+11
- Postcode: 3579

Kerang East is a locality situated in Victoria, Australia. The locality is located in the Shire of Gannawarra local government area, 289 kilometres (180 mi) north west of the state capital, Melbourne. At the 2016 census, Kerang East had a population of 40.
