= Koroop =

Koroop Victoria
- Coordinates: 35°44′30″S 144°4′39″E
- Population: 80 (2016 census)
- Postcode(s): 3579
- Location: 293 km (182 mi) NW of Melbourne
- LGA(s): Shire of Gannawarra
- State electorate(s): Murray Plains
- Federal division(s): Mallee

Koroop is a locality situated in Victoria, Australia. The locality is located in the Shire of Gannawarra local government area, 293 kilometres (182 mi) north west of the state capital, Melbourne. At the 2016 census, Koroop had a population of 80.
