= Murrabit West =

- Town
- Coordinates: 35°30′42″S 143°53′12″E
- Country: Australia
- State: Victoria
- LGA: Shire of Gannawarra
- Location: 313 km (194 mi) NW of Melbourne

Government
  - State electorate: Murray Plains
  - Federal division: Mallee

Population
  - Total: 45 (2016 census)
- Time zone: UTC+10
  - Summer (DST): UTC+11
- Postcode: 3579

Murrabit West is a locality situated in Victoria, Australia. The locality is located in the Shire of Gannawarra local government area, 313 kilometres (194 mi) north west of the state capital, Melbourne. At the 2016 census, Keely had a population of 45.
