= Art Mietzcke =

Australian rules footballer (1914–1972)

Personal information
- Full name: Arthur Charles Mietzcke
- Born: 28 June 1914; Koondrook, Victoria
- Died: 9 June 1972 (aged 57); Prahran, Victoria
- Original team: Koondrook
- Height: 180 cm (5 ft 11 in)
- Weight: 82 kg (181 lb)

Playing career^{1}
Years	Club	Games (Goals)
1931–1933	South Melbourne	18 (8)
1934–1940	Northcote (VFA)	109 (91)
- ^{1} Playing statistics correct to the end of 1940.

Arthur Charles Mietzcke (28 June 1914 – 9 June 1972) was an Australian rules footballer who played for the South Melbourne Football Club in the Victorian Football League (VFL).

Mietzcke later served in the Australian Army during World War II.
