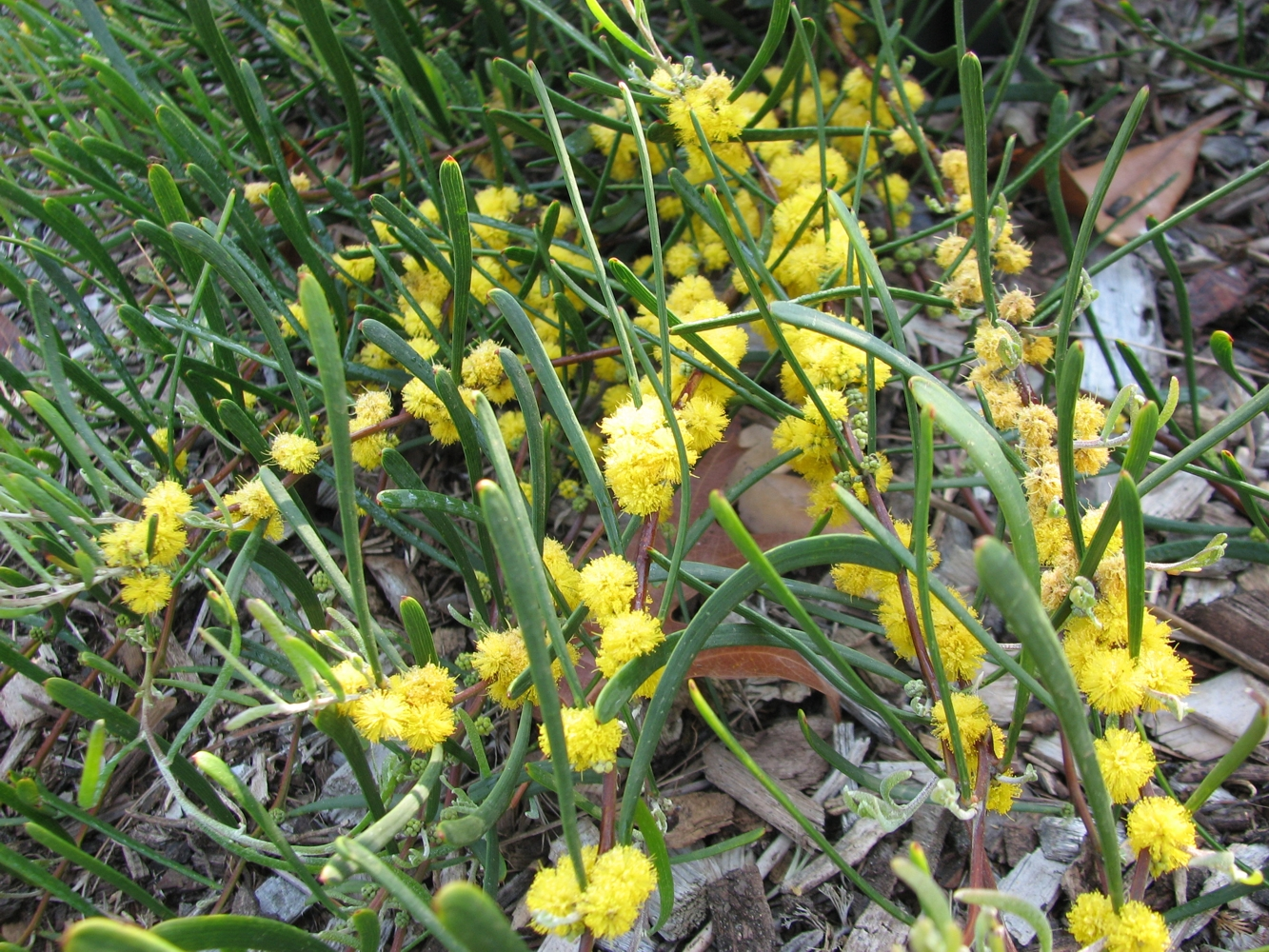

Scientific classification
- Kingdom: Plantae
- Clade: Tracheophytes
- Clade: Angiosperms
- Clade: Eudicots
- Clade: Rosids
- Order: Fabales
- Family: Fabaceae
- Subfamily: Caesalpinioideae
- Clade: Mimosoid clade
- Genus: Acacia
- Species: A. farinosa

Binomial name
- Acacia farinosa Lindl.
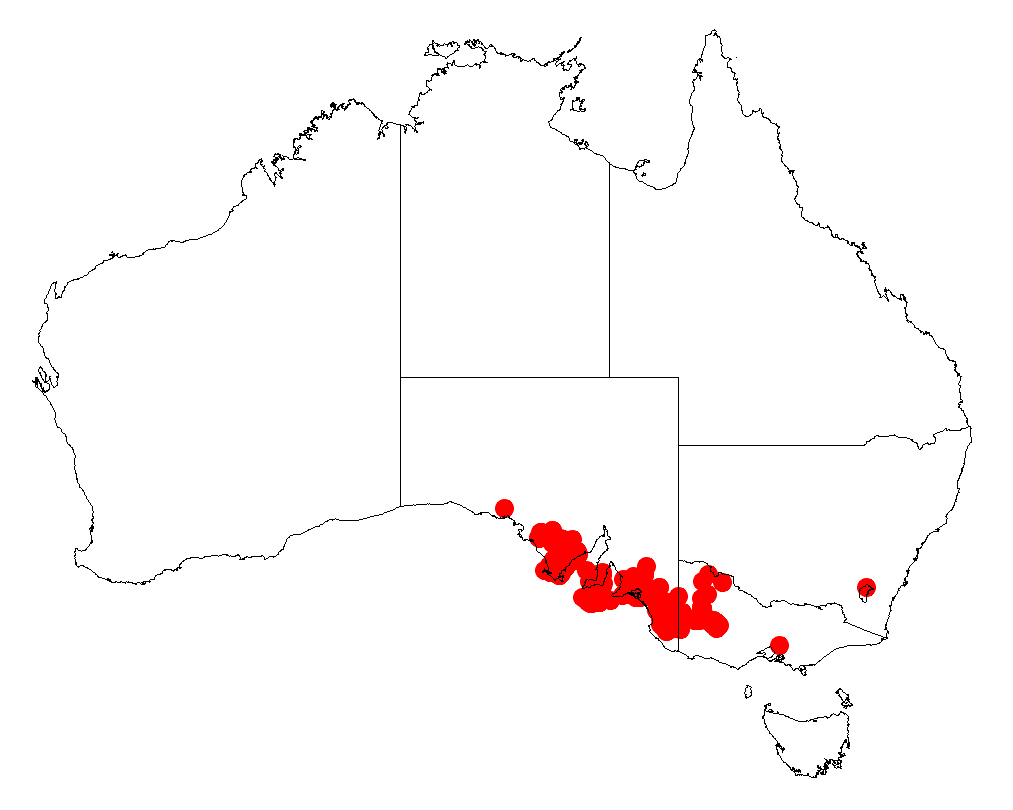
- Occurrence data from AVH

Synonyms
- Racosperma farinosum (Lindl.) Pedley; Acacia whanii auct. non F.Muell. ex Benth.: Whibley, D.J.E. & Symon, D.E. (1992)

= Acacia farinosa =

Mealy wattle

Species of plant

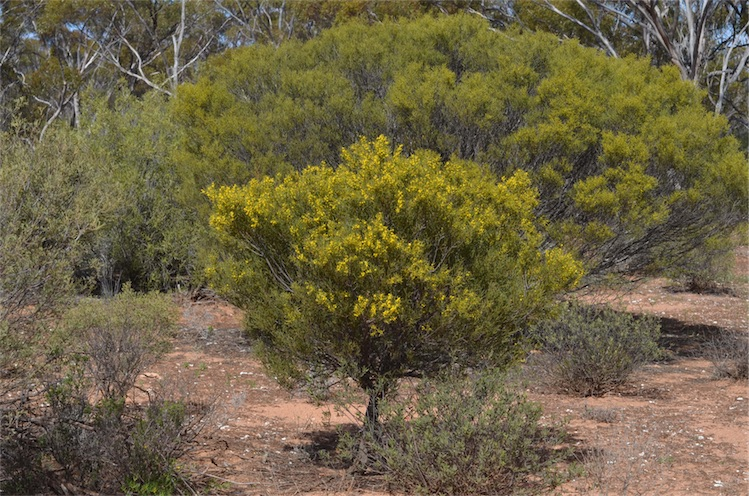
Habit in Gawler Ranges National Park

Acacia farinosa, commonly known as mealy wattle, is a species of flowering plant in the family Fabaceae and is endemic to south-eastern continental Australia. It is a rounded shrub with terete, glabrous branchlets, oblanceolate to linear phyllodes, spherical heads of golden yellow flowers and linear, curved and twisted, crusty pods.

== Description ==
Acacia farinosa is a rounded shrub that typically grows to a height of 1–2 m (3 ft 3 in – 6 ft 7 in) and has glabrous, terete branchlets that have soft hairs pressed against the surface. Its phyllodes are ascending, oblanceolate to linear, mostly 20–70 mm (0.79–2.76 in) long, 2–6 mm (0.079–0.236 in) wide, rigid, thick and more or less fleshy. There is a gland 2–9 mm (0.079–0.354 in) above the base of the phyllode. The flowers are borne in spherical heads on a peduncle 2–4 mm (0.079–0.157 in) long, each head 3.5–4 mm (0.14–0.16 in) in diameter with seven to seventeen golden yellow flowers. Flowering occurs from July to November, and the pods are linear, crusty, rigid, curved and twisted, up to 60 mm (2.4 in) long, 2–3 mm (0.079–0.118 in) wide and glabrous. The seeds are elliptic, 3.5–4.0 mm (0.14–0.16 in) long and black with a small aril on the end.

== Taxonomy ==
Acacia farinosa was first formally described in 1838 by English botanist John Lindley from material collected on Thomas Mitchell's expedition near Lake Charm, Victoria in 1836 and was published in Mitchell's Three Expeditions into the interior of Eastern Australia. The specific epithet (farinosa) means 'covered with mealiness' or 'powdery', referring to the young stems and peduncles.

== Distribution and habitat ==
Mealy wattle mostly grows in sand or loam in shrubland and woodland, often with lerp mallee (Eucalyptus incrassata), in the Eyre and Yorke Peninsulas, on Kangaroo Island and south-eastern South Australia, and extending to western Victoria between Edenhope and Swan Hill.

== Use in horticulture ==
This species may be used as a groundcover in coastal areas.
