= Gredgwin =

- Town
- Coordinates: 35°57′36″S 143°36′59″E
- Country: Australia
- State: Victoria
- LGAs: Shire of Gannawarra; Shire of Loddon

Government
  - State electorate: Murray Plains
  - Federal division: Mallee
- Postcode: 3537

Gredgwin is a locality in the Shire of Loddon and the Shire of Gannawarra, Victoria, Australia. At the 2021 census, Gredgwin had "no people or a very low population".

== History ==
Gredgwin Railway Station opened in 1894.
