= Murray River road bridge =

Murray River road bridge may refer to:

- Murray River road bridge, Murray Bridge, South Australia
- Murray River road bridge, Swan Hill, Victoria

== See also ==
- Murray River bridge, Barham, New South Wales
- Murray River road and railway bridge, Tocumwal, New South Wales
- List of crossings of the Murray River
