= Horfield, Victoria =

Horfield Victoria
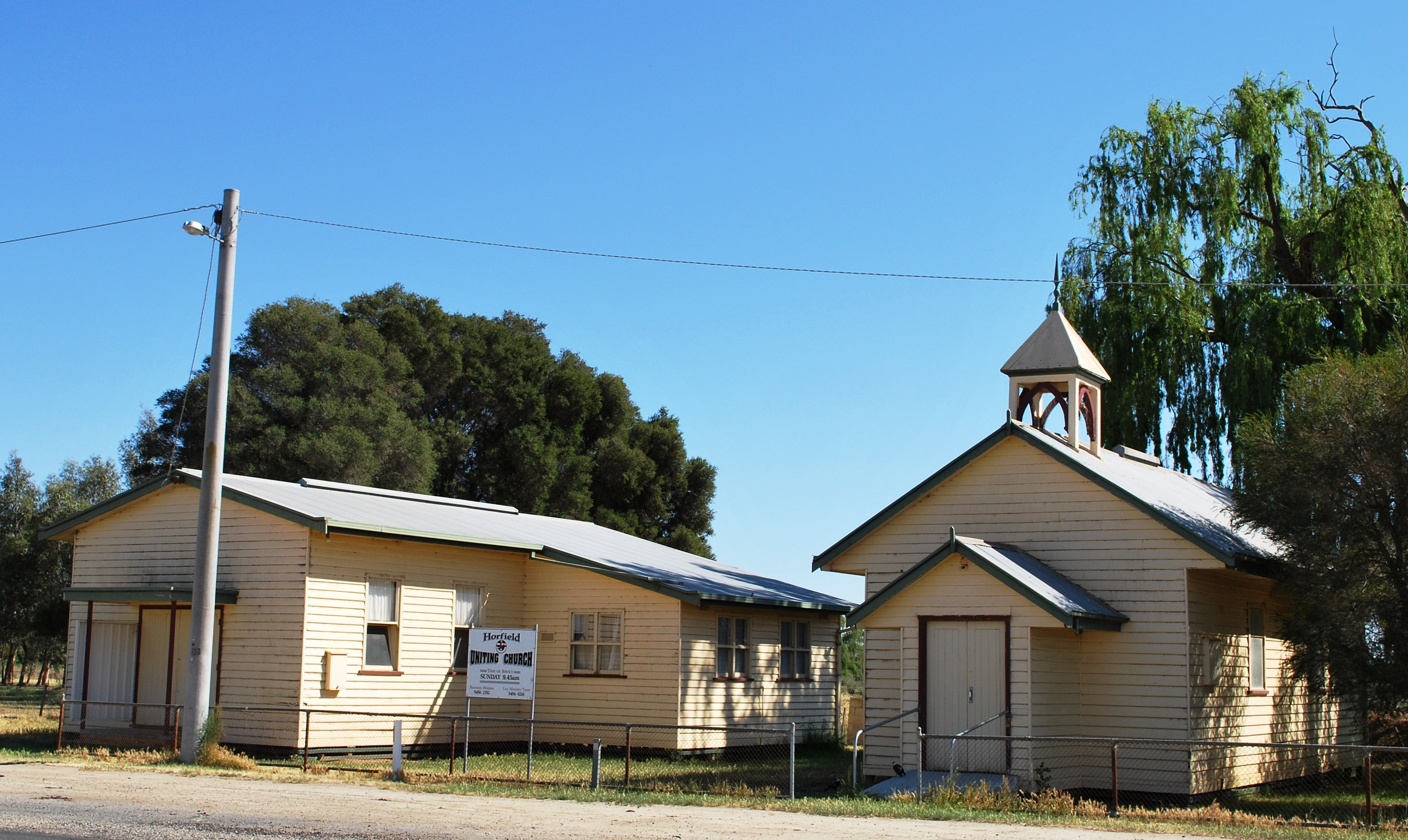
- Uniting church and hall, 2008

- Coordinates: 35°52′48″S 144°13′18″E
- Population: 91 (2016 census)
- Postcode(s): 3567
- Location: 267 km (166 mi) NW of Melbourne; 59 km (37 mi) NW of Echuca; 9 km (6 mi) S of Cohuna
- LGA(s): Shire of Gannawarra; Shire of Loddon
- State electorate(s): Murray Plains
- Federal division(s): Mallee

Horfield is a locality in the Shire of Gannawarra and the Shire of Loddon, Victoria, Australia, 267 kilometres (166 mi) north west of the state capital, Melbourne. At the 2016 census, Horfield had a population of 91.
