= Myall, Victoria =

Myall
- Town
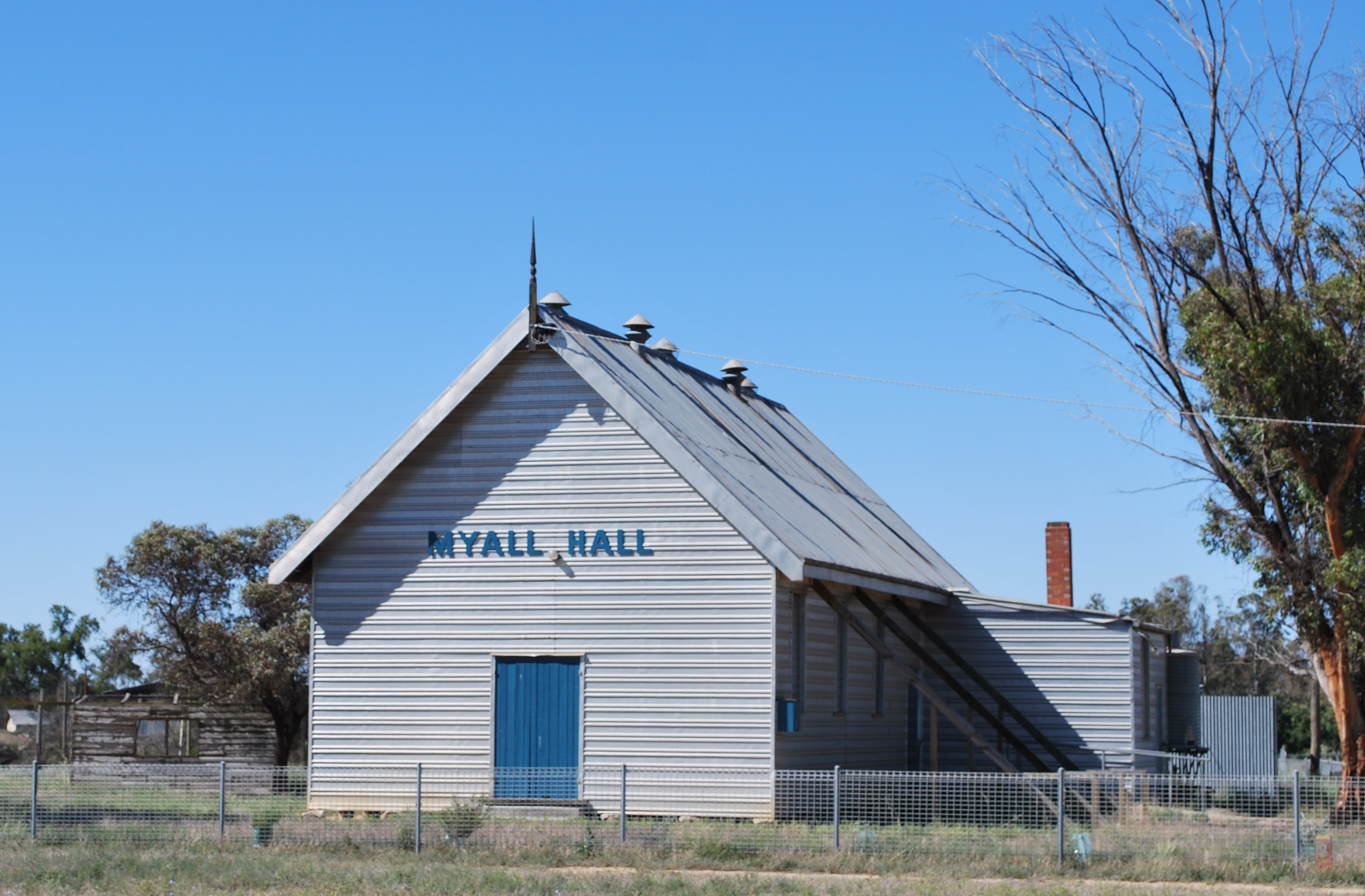
- Public hall, 2009

- Coordinates: 35°34′46″S 143°59′58″E
- Country: Australia
- State: Victoria
- LGA: Shire of Gannawarra

Government
  - State electorate: Murray Plains
  - Federal division: Mallee

Population
  - Total: 98 (SAL 2021)
- Postcode: 3579
Localities around Myall
Murrabit	New South Wales	New South Wales
Capels Crossing	Myall	New South Wales
Westby	Teal Point	Koondrook

Myall is a locality in the local government area of the Shire of Gannawarra, Victoria, Australia.

The Stony Crossing railway line passed the western side of the locality and the Myall railway station was on that line.
