= Appin South =

- Town
- Coordinates: 35°55′37″S 143°51′54″E
- Country: Australia
- State: Victoria
- LGAs: Shire of Loddon; Shire of Gannawarra

Government
  - State electorate: Murray Plains
  - Federal division: Mallee

Population
  - Total: 38 (2021 census)
- Postcode: 3579

Appin South is a locality in the Shire of Loddon and the Shire of Gannawarra, Victoria, Australia. At the 2021 census, Appin South had a population of 38.
