= Lake Charm =

- Town
- Coordinates: 35°36′30″S 143°48′08″E
- Country: Australia
- State: Victoria
- LGA: Shire of Gannawarra
- Location: 296 km (184 mi) NW of Melbourne; 41 km (25 mi) SE of Swan Hill; 19 km (12 mi) NW of Kerang

Government
  - State electorate: Murray Plains
  - Federal division: Mallee

Population
  - Total: 311 (2011 census)
- Postcode: 3581

Lake Charm is a town in the Shire of Gannawarra, Victoria, Australia. At the 2011 census, Lake Charm had a population of 311.

The area is a popular destination for waterskiing, boating, duck hunting, fishing and scenic drives. It is south of Swan Hill, Lake Charm is 19 km from Kerang.

== Lakes ==
Lake Charm has a surface area of 457 hectares and is especially noted for its large redfin.

Just north of Lake Charm is Racecourse Lake, which is a good fishing spot with picnic facilities.

== Sport ==
The Lake Charm Football club combined with Mystic Park Football Club in the early 1950s becoming the Lakes Football Club, and were a member of the Kerang and District Football League, the club went into recess following the 1985 season. Lakes as the team was known to its followers won the KDFL 1966 under 16 competition premiership and they took out the premiership at Senior level in 1972. Lake Charm once had a small golf course . There is a Tennis Club at Lake Charm and it is still active. The Lake Charm cricket team played in the North West Lakes Cricket association both ceased in the early 1970s. Other popular sports at Lake Charm are water skiing, sailing and fishing.

== Railway ==
Just south of town is the Yungera railway line. The town's railway station closed on 31 July 1977.
