= Telephone numbers in Australia =

- Location of Australia (dark green)
- Country: Australia
- Continent: Australia
- Regulator: Australian Communications and Media Authority
- Numbering plan type: Closed
- NSN length: 9 FNN/MSN Full National Number / Mobile Service Number
- Format: Landlines: x xxxx xxxx Mobiles: 4xx xxx xxx Other non-geographic numbers: 1800 xxx xxx (Free Call* service) 1300 xxx xxx (Local Call Cost†), 13 xx xx (Local/Nearest Business Number - can route geographically to nearest point of service), 12xx (Directory and Operator assist Services), 19xx (Information Services)
- Country code: 61
- International access: 0011
- Long-distance: 0

Telephone numbers in Australia are administered by the Australian Communications and Media Authority (ACMA) under delegation by the Department of Infrastructure, Transport, Regional Development, Communications and the Arts. The Telecommunications Act 1997 in subsection 455(1) defines a legislative instrument. This instrument is the Telecommunications Numbering Plan 2025, which defines the format, numerical allocation and use of number ranges.

== Overview ==
For landline telephony, Australia is geographically divided into only four areas, three of which comprise more than one state or territory. All local telephone numbers within the four areas have eight digits, consisting (mainly) of a four-digit exchange code and a four-digit local line number. The national significant number consists of a single-digit area code followed by the local eight-digit number, a total of nine digits. When calling a landline telephone in Australia in an area other than that of the caller, the telephone number is preceded by the Australian trunk prefix 0 (termed Trunk Access Prefix - in Australia) and the area code: 0x xxxx xxxx. In this context, the trunk code is typically incorporated into the area code domestically.

- 00 – International and Emergency access (see below for details)
- 01 – Alternative phone services
  - 014 – Satellite phones
  - 0151 – Public safety service
  - 0163 – Pager numbers (defunct service; no longer available)
  - 0198 – Data numbers (e.g. 0198 308 888 is the dial-up PoP number for Telstra)
- 02 – Geographic: Central East region (NSW, ACT, small parts of VIC)
- 03 – Geographic: South-east region (VIC, TAS, small parts of NSW)
- 04 – Digital Mobile services (4G, 5G and GSM)
- 0550 – Location Independent Communication Services
- 07 – Geographic: North-east region (QLD)
- 08 – Geographic: Central and West region (SA, NT, WA, small part of NSW)
- 09 – Internet of things service
- 1 – Non-geographic numbers (mostly for domestic use; see below for details)

The current numbering plan would appear to be sufficient to cope with potential increase in demand for services for quite some time to come. Area code 06 is unused. In addition, each other area code has large number ranges unallocated.

When dialling from outside Australia, after dialling the appropriate international access code, the country code for Australia is 61, which is followed by the nine-digit national significant number. This is without any National "Trunk Access Code", as is normal with most countries.

Australian local telephone numbers have eight digits, conventionally written in the form xxxx xxxx. Mobile numbers are written in the form of ten digits. When dialed within Australia, the 0 must be included, and 4, which indicates the service required is a mobile number. Mobile numbers are conventionally written 04xx xxx xxx. If a landline or mobile number is written where it may be viewed by an international audience (e.g. in an email signature or on a website) then the number is often written as +61 x xxxx xxxx or +61 4xx xxx xxx respectively.

The Australian national trunk access code, 0, is not used for calls originated from locations outside Australia. Some numbers beginning with a 1 instead of a 0 do not require the first digit to be dropped for international calls; +13 and +1300 local rate numbers may be dialled directly after the required international access code and the country code.

=== Fixed-line telephone numbers ===
Within Australia, dialing a number in another area requires dialing the trunk code 0, followed by the area code, and then the local number.

In major centres, the first four digits specify the CCA (Call Collection Area, also known as an exchange), and the remaining digits specify a number at that exchange, up to 10,000 of which may be connected. Smaller exchanges in more remote areas may have fewer than a hundred connected numbers.

To access numbers in the same area, it is necessary to dial only the eight digits concerned. To access a number in another area it is first necessary to dial the trunk code of 0, followed by the area code (2, 3, 7 or 8) and then the specific local number.

Area code boundaries do not follow state/territory boundaries precisely. Notable are the part of New South Wales around Broken Hill (a large part of the state's area but less than 1% of its population), which uses 08) 80xx numbers, and Wodonga, which is in Victoria but is within the New South Wales area code (02). Similarly, New South Wales border towns including Deniliquin and Buronga are within the Southeast (Victorian) area code (03), and Tweed Heads within the Northeast (Queensland) area code (07). Physical exchanges can be allocated one or more prefixes and modern technology allows sub-sets of these number ranges to be allocated to switching entities located at a distance from the exchange in which their controlling terminal is located.

Landlines use a dialing plan that makes dialing of the area code optional for calls with the same area code for the caller and the destination.

=== Mobile phones ===
Within Australia, mobile phone numbers begin with 04 – the Australian national trunk code 0, plus the mobile indicator 4 – followed by eight digits. This is generally written as 04XX XXX XXX within Australia, or as +61 4XX XXX XXX for an international audience. This format is the result of mobile carriers advertising numbers in such a way so as to clearly identify the owning telco prior to mobile number portability, introduced on 25 September 2001. Prior to MNP, mobile operators generally reserved number ranges in blocks of 04 xy z.

The xy-digit codes (sometimes xy z) are allocated per network. Since the introduction of number portability, there is no longer a fixed relationship between the mobile phone number and the network it uses.

In 2015, prefix 05 (other than 0550) was also reserved for digital mobile phones as a part of the Telecommunications Numbering Plan 2015. However, as of 2024 no numbers have been allocated with this prefix.

Within Australia, mobile numbers must always be dialed with all ten digits, regardless of the caller's location.

Because mobile phones (cell phones) possess the capacity to store many long telephone numbers, it is advisable to store all such numbers in the form of "+ (Country Code} (Area Code) (LOCAL Number)".

Therefore, then one could use one's Mobile Phone to dial any Phone Number from any country in the world, without having to know the Trunk Access Codes of that country.

Also, the emergency code of 112 will redirect the call from any cell/mobile phone to the "Emergency Service" of any country from which the call originates. Calling 911 in Australia will not redirect to 000.

== Geographic numbers ==
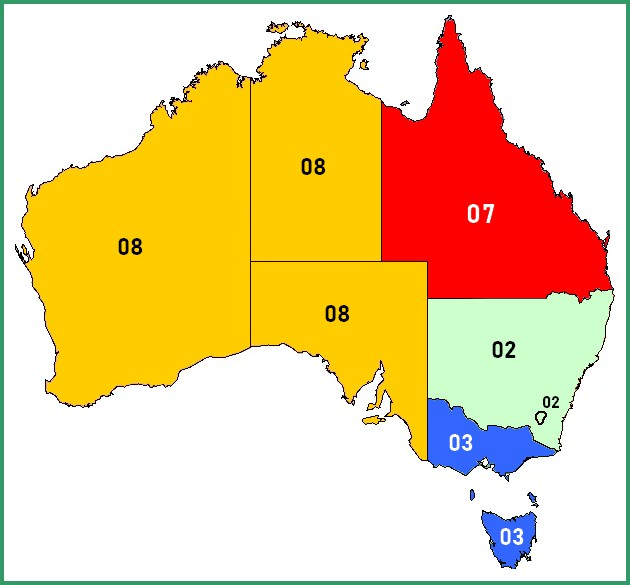
Area Codes of Australia

Geographical areas are identified by the area code and the first few digits of the local number. The codes include the trunk prefix for long-distance calling.

=== Central-East region (02) ===
- 02 30 – Newcastle, Lower Hunter (Note: New in 2025)
- 02 31 – Bathurst, Orange
- 02 32 – Wollongong
- 02 33 – Gosford, Central Coast
- 02 34 – Bourke, Dubbo
- 02 35 – Port Macquarie, Kempsey, Taree, Lord Howe Island, Muswellbrook
- 02 36 – Coffs Harbour, Grafton, Lismore, Murwillumbah
- 02 37 – Armidale, Tamworth, Northern Tablelands (Note: New in 2012)
- 02 38 – Bowral, Crookwell, Goulburn, Marulan (Note: Prefixes proposed by ACMA and legislated in early 2008. Note, some of these numbers are now actually in use)
- 02 39 – Griffith, Wagga Wagga, Riverina
- 02 40 – Newcastle, Lower Hunter (Note: Added since renumbering)
- 02 41 – Newcastle, Lower Hunter
- 02 42 – Wollongong
- 02 43 – Gosford, Central Coast
- 02 44 – Batemans Bay, Moruya, Nowra
- 02 45 – Windsor, Richmond
- 02 46 – Campbelltown, Camden, Narellan, Picton, Appin and others
- 02 47 – Penrith, Blue Mountains
- 02 48 – Bowral, Crookwell, Goulburn, Marulan
- 02 49 – Newcastle, Lower Hunter
- 02 50 – Albury, Corryong, Wodonga
- 02 51 – Canberra, Queanbeyan, Yass
- 02 52 – Canberra, Queanbeyan, Yass
- 02 53 – Bathurst, Orange
- 02 54 – Bega, Merimbula, Tathra, Cooma
- 02 55 – Port Macquarie, Kempsey, Taree, Lord Howe Island, Muswellbrook (Note: 0x 5550 and 0x 7010 reserved for fictitious use.)
- 02 56 – Murwillumbah, Grafton, Lismore
- 02 57 – Armidale, Tamworth, Northern Tablelands
- 02 58 – Bourke, Dubbo, Far West
- 02 59 – Griffith, Wagga Wagga, Riverina
- 02 60 – Albury, Corryong, Wodonga
- 02 61 – Canberra, Queanbeyan, Yass
- 02 62 – Canberra, Queanbeyan, Yass
- 02 63 – Bathurst, Orange, Cowra
- 02 64 – Bega, Merimbula, Tathra, Cooma
- 02 65 – Port Macquarie, Kempsey, Taree, Lord Howe Island, Muswellbrook
- 02 66 – Coffs Harbour, Grafton, Lismore, Murwillumbah
- 02 67 – Armidale, Glen Innes, Gunnedah, Inverell, Moree, Narrabri, Tamworth
- 02 68 – Bourke, Dubbo, Cobar
- 02 69 – Griffith, Wagga Wagga, Riverina
- 02 7 – Sydney
- 02 8 – Sydney
- 02 9 – Sydney

=== South-east region (03) ===
- 03 30 – Mildura, Balranald
- 03 31 – Traralgon, Bairnsdale
- 03 32 – Geelong, Colac
- 03 33 – Ballarat
- 03 34 – Bendigo
- 03 40 – Mildura, Balranald
- 03 41 – Traralgon, Bairnsdale
- 03 42 – Geelong, Colac
- 03 43 – Ballarat
- 03 44 – Bendigo
- 03 45 – Warrnambool
- 03 46 – Drouin, Foster, Warragul, Wonthaggi
- 03 47 – Wangaratta
- 03 48 – Deniliquin, Numurkah, Shepparton
- 03 49 – Mornington
- 03 50 – Mildura, Balranald
- 03 51 – Traralgon, Bairnsdale
- 03 52 – Colac, Geelong
- 03 53 – Ballarat
- 03 54 – Bendigo
- 03 55 – Warrnambool, Casterton, Portland
- 03 56 – Drouin, Foster, Warragul, Wonthaggi
- 03 57 – Wangaratta
- 03 58 – Deniliquin, Shepparton
- 03 59 – Mornington, Pakenham, Rosebud, Warburton, Yarra Ranges
- 03 60 – Hobart
- 03 61 – Hobart
- 03 62 – Hobart
- 03 63 – Launceston
- 03 64 – Devonport, Burnie, Queenstown
- 03 65 – Devonport, Burnie, Queenstown
- 03 67 – Launceston
- 03 68 – Launceston
- 03 7 – Melbourne
- 03 8 – Melbourne
- 03 9 – Melbourne

=== North-east region (07) ===
- 07 2 – Brisbane, Bribie Island
- 07 3 – Brisbane, Bribie Island
- 07 40 – Cairns, Far North Queensland
- 07 41 – Bundaberg, Kingaroy, Maryborough
- 07 42 – Cairns
- 07 43 – Bundaberg, Kingaroy, Maryborough
- 07 44 – Townsville, North Queensland
- 07 45 – Toowoomba, Roma, south-west
- 07 46 – Toowoomba, Roma, South West
- 07 47 – Townsville, North Queensland
- 07 48 – Rockhampton, Mackay
- 07 49 – Rockhampton, Mackay, Gladstone
- 07 51 – Sunshine Coast, Esk, Nambour, Gatton, Caboolture
- 07 52 – Sunshine Coast, Esk, Nambour, Gatton, Caboolture
- 07 53 – Sunshine Coast, Esk, Nambour, Gatton, Caboolture
- 07 54 – Sunshine Coast, Esk, Nambour, Gatton, Caboolture
- 07 55 – Gold Coast, Tweed Heads (NSW), Beaudesert
- 07 56 – Gold Coast, Beaudesert
- 07 57 – Gold Coast, Beaudesert
- 07 58 – Gold Coast, Beaudesert
- 07 70 – Cairns, Far North Queensland
- 07 72 – Cairns
- 07 73 – Bundaberg, Kingaroy, Maryborough
- 07 75 – Inglewood, Toowoomba
- 07 76 – Inglewood, Toowoomba
- 07 77 – Townsville, North Queensland
- 07 78 – Rockhampton, Mackay, Gladstone
- 07 79 – Rockhampton, Mackay, Gladstone

=== Central and West region (08) ===
- 08 20 – Adelaide
- 08 21 – Adelaide
- 08 25 – Riverland, Murraylands
- 08 26 – Ceduna
- 08 27 – South East
- 08 28 – Mid North
- 08 29 – Northern Territory (Alice Springs, Darwin)
- 08 41 – Port Hedland
- 08 51 – Port Hedland
- 08 52 – Perth
- 08 53 – Perth
- 08 54 – Perth
- 08 55 – Bullsbrook East, Northam, Pinjarra (Mandurah)
- 08 57 – Bridgetown, Bunbury
- 08 58 – Albany
- 08 60 – Kalgoorlie, Merredin, Goldfields-Esperance
- 08 61 – Perth
- 08 62 – Perth
- 08 63 – Perth
- 08 64 – Perth
- 08 65 – Perth
- 08 66 – Moora
- 08 67 – Bridgetown, Bunbury
- 08 68 – Albany
- 08 69 – Geraldton
- 08 70 – Adelaide
- 08 71 – Adelaide
- 08 72 – Adelaide
- 08 73 – Adelaide
- 08 74 – Adelaide
- 08 75 – Riverland, Murraylands
- 08 76 – Ceduna
- 08 77 – South East
- 08 78 – Mid North
- 08 79 – Northern Territory (Alice Springs, Darwin)
- 08 80 – Broken Hill (NSW)
- 08 81 – Adelaide
- 08 82 – Adelaide
- 08 83 – Adelaide
- 08 84 – Adelaide
- 08 85 – Riverland, Murraylands, Barossa Valley
- 08 86 – Ceduna
- 08 87 – South East
- 08 88 – Mid North
- 08 89 – Northern Territory (Alice Springs, Darwin)
- 08 90 – Kalgoorlie
- 08 91 – Derby [inc. Cocos/Keeling & Christmas Islands.]
- 08 92 – Perth
- 08 93 – Perth
- 08 94 – Perth
- 08 95 – Bullsbrook East, Northam, Pinjarra (Mandurah)
- 08 96 – Moora
- 08 97 – Bunbury, Busselton, Bridgetown, Collie, Harvey
- 08 98 – Albany
- 08 99 – Geraldton

== Non-geographic numbers ==
=== Mobile phone numbers (04, 05) ===
Each mobile phone company is allocated numbers in blocks, which are listed below. However mobile number portability means an individual number might have been "ported". There are also many MVNOs which use numbers from their wholesaler or might have their own ranges.

ACMA planned to introduce the "05" range for mobile numbers in 2017, when the "04" range was expected to be exhausted. So far, no such numbers have been introduced.

Allocation for numbers in the range 04xy z00 000 – 04xy z99 999
y	0										1										2										3										4										5										6										7										8										9									
z	0	1	2	3	4	5	6	7	8	9	0	1	2	3	4	5	6	7	8	9	0	1	2	3	4	5	6	7	8	9	0	1	2	3	4	5	6	7	8	9	0	1	2	3	4	5	6	7	8	9	0	1	2	3	4	5	6	7	8	9	0	1	2	3	4	5	6	7	8	9	0	1	2	3	4	5	6	7	8	9	0	1	2	3	4	5	6	7	8	9	0	1	2	3	4	5	6	7	8	9
040yz	Telstra										Optus																														Vodafone																														Telstra																													
041yz	Vodafone										Optus																														Vodafone																														Telstra																													
042yz	*		Vodafone								Optus																														Vodafone																														Telstra																													
043yz	Vodafone										Optus																				Vodafone										Optus																				Telstra																																							
044yz	O	Spare																																											T		Spare																								Telstra																				Voda			S		Vodafone				
045yz	Vodafone																											S		*	Spare																				Telstra																																																	
046yz	Telstra																																																												Optus										Telstra										Spa			Optus							Lycamobile									
047yz	Lycamobile								Spare																	Telstra																																																							Optus												Spare							
048yz	P	Telstra							P	*	Optus										Telstra														Spare				T	T	Telstra																		Piv		Telstra																												P	T	Optus								*	P
049yz	Telstra															*	Telstra																													Spare																									Telstra																													

*Allocation of numbers in these ranges
Multi	Range	Provider
04200	0420 000 000 – 0420 019 999	Sydney Trains
04200	0420 020 000 – 0420 029 999	Sinch Australia Pty Ltd
04200	0420 030 000 – 0420 039 999	Spare
04200	0420 040 000 – 0420 049 999	Symbio Networks Pty Ltd (subsidiary of Aussie Broadband)
04200	0420 050 000 – 0420 099 999	Spare
04201	0420 100 000 – 0420 109 999	Pivotel Satellite Pty Ltd
04201	0420 110 000 – 0420 119 999	Compatel Limited
04201	0420 120 000 – 0420 199 999	Spare
04529	0452 900 000 – 0452 919 999	Spare
04529	0452 920 000 – 0452 929 999	NetSIP Pty Ltd (subsidiary of Aussie Broadband)
04529	0452 930 000 – 0454 999 999	Spare
04809	0480 900 000 – 0480 909 999	Field Solutions Group Pty Ltd
04809	0480 910 000 – 0480 999 999	Spare
04898	0489 800 000 – 0489 839 999	Spare
04898	0489 840 000 – 0489 849 999	VicTrack
04898	0489 850 000 – 0489 899 999	Spare
04899	0489 900 000 – 0489 999 999	Pivotel Satellite Pty Ltd
04915	0491 500 000 – 0491 519 999	Bird.com Pty Ltd
04915	0491 520 000 – 0491 569 999	Spare
04915	0491 570 000 – 0491 579 999	Australian Communications and Media Authority
04915	0491 580 000 – 0491 589 999	LMGPS Pty Ltd
04915	0491 590 000 – 0491 599 999	Spare

The numbers 0491 570 006, 0491 570 156, 0491 570 157, 0491 570 158, 0491 570 159, 0491 570 110, 0491 570 313, 0491 570 737, 0491 571 266, 0491 571 491, 0491 571 804, 0491 572 549, 0491 572 665, 0491 572 983, 0491 573 770, 0491 573 087, 0491 574 118, 0491 574 632, 0491 575 254, 0491 575 789, 0491 576 398, 0491 576 801, 0491 577 426, 0491 577 644, 0491 578 957, 0491 578 148, 0491 578 888, 0491 579 212 and 0491 579 760 are reserved for fictitious use.

=== Satellite phone numbers (014) ===
Numbers beginning with 014 are predominantly used for satellite services. Parts of the 014 prefix had previously been used as a 9 digit, AMPS mobile phone access code.

Prefix 01471 is the ten-digit replacement for the previous, nine-digit ITERRA satellite phone code 0071 (followed by five digits), prior to its use for ITERRA (and other satellite services). These numbers were allocated in March 1999.

Numbers beginning with 0145 are used for services utilised on the Optus network in Australia. This is predominantly used for MobileSat and Thuraya mobile satellite services. These numbers were allocated in December 1992: 222,000 with the rest "spare".

The prefixes 0141, 0142, 0143, 0145 and 0147 are set aside for satellite systems; the rest of the 014 prefix range is currently not allocated to any other service type. There is not much demand for these services, and many satellite phones now have normal mobile phone numbers (prefix 04), so it is not likely for the entire 014 range to be allocated to satellite services.

=== Location independent communications service (0550) ===
These numbers are designed for VoIP (Voice over Internet Protocol) systems, where they work like a fixed number but not allocated on a geographical level. It is possible that LICS numbers will be absorbed into mobile numbers in the future, as they provide similar features. Indeed, the July 2012 variation of the numbering plan allocated the rest of the 05 range to digital mobile numbering.

=== Data numbers (0198) ===
All calls to 0198 numbers are a "local call" cost like 13 and 1300 numbers but are used for Internet service provider access numbers. They are used both with dial-up modems and ISDN.

=== Public safety service (0151) ===
Public safety service means a carriage service that is used by a recognised person who operates an emergency call service, as defined in section 19 of the Telecommunications Act 1997, to assist them in the delivery of that service. The prefixes of the public safety service are 01510 and 01513 with the format of 0151n xxxx, where n can be 0 or 3. These numbers have been available since 24 March 2025 when the Telecommunications Numbering Plan 2025 replaced the Telecommunications Numbering Plan 2015.

=== Internet of things service (09) ===
Internet of things services are carriage services that are used for consumer and enterprise connected internet of things devices and applications and require the use of voice telephony and/or messaging services in addition to data (internet protocol and non-internet protocol services). The prefix of the internet of things services are 0900, 0910, 0920, 0930 and 0940. These numbers have been available since 24 March 2025 when the Telecommunications Numbering Plan 2025 replaced the Telecommunications Numbering Plan 2015.

=== Obsolete numbers ===
Most numbers that are no longer used have been removed from the Telecommunications Numbering Plan 2015, whether in previous variations or in this complete replacement. (See below)

However, the 0163 prefix is still allocated for use with pagers. This was reduced from 016 in a variation to the previous numbering plan. As of March 2011 only 1000 numbers were allocated, and by the end of 2012 there were none allocated.

== Non-geographic numbers (domestic use) ==
The following codes are not generally dialable from international points, but used in domestic dialling:

- 000 – Emergency (Police, Fire, Ambulance)
- 106 – TTY emergency (for the hearing-impaired)
- 11 – Community services
  - 1100 – Before You Dig Australia (to prevent inadvertent damage to underground cables or infrastructure)
  - 112 – Alternative access to Emergency Services (Police, Fire, Ambulance; diallable from GSM mobile phones only)
  - 119x – Information services (e.g. 1194 was time and 1196 was weather (both disabled from 1 October 2019))
- 12 – Network services
  - 1221 – International faults reporting service
  - 1222 – Call costs and enquiries service
  - 1223 – Directory assistance
  - 1225 – International directory assistance
  - 123x – Premium operator services (e.g. 1234 is Sensis personal assistance)
  - 124xx – Other operator services (e.g. 12456 is Sensis Call Connect)
  - 125xxx – Telstra mobile services (e.g. 125111 is Telstra mobile customer service)
  - 1268x, 1268 xxxx and 1268 xxx xxx – Internal network services
  - 127 – Testing numbers (e.g. 12722123 reads your number from a Telstra line, 12723123 reads your number for an Optus line) (length varies), dial 12722199 then hang up and the call is returned by the exchange (used to test handset functionality)
  - 1282 – Call information service
  - 128xx – Call information service
- 13 xx xx and 1300 xxx xxx – "Local Rate" calls, except for VoIP and mobile phone users
- 1345 xxxx – Local rate calls (only used for back-to-base monitored alarm systems)
- 14xx – Carrier override prefixes (e.g. 1411 is the override prefix for the Telstra network; see below for details)
- 180 xxxx and 1800 xxx xxx – FreeCall
- 183x – Caller identification override prefixes (1831 blocks caller-id sending while 1832 unblocks caller-id sending)
- 188 xxxx – Premium SMS (since moved to 19 range)
- 189 xx – Calling card service
- 19 xx xx and 19xx xxxx – Premium SMS
- 190x xxx xxx – Premium rate services (usually 1902 and 1900)

Some notes:

- These numbers do not have a Trunk Access Code prefix (0).
- The 106 number is believed to be the first nationwide TTY emergency service in the world.
- 13 xx xx, 1300 xxx xxx and 1800 xxx xxx numbers can provide source-based routing, used by organisations such as pizza chains that advertise one number nationwide that connects customers to their nearest store.
- Virtually all FreeCall numbers in use are 1800 xxx xxx, though some organisations do use the shorter 7-digit version.
- Some of these numbers are dialable from locations outside Australia. It is up to the individual owner to set this up correctly (for 13 and 18 numbers at least) (e.g. +61 13x xxx)
- 911 will not re-route to triple zero as the prefix 911x has been allocated to landlines under the current numbering plan. 911 may redirect to 000 when using a mobile phone, like 112, but it is not encouraged as knowledge of these numbers causes confusion

=== Emergency services numbers (000, 106, 112) ===
000 is the primary emergency telephone number in Australia. Secondary emergency numbers are 106 (for use by the hearing impaired with a TTY terminal) and the international GSM mobile emergency telephone number 112.

Increased awareness of the 112 emergency number in Australia has led to the potential for confusion over which number to call in an emergency. As a secondary emergency number, 112 is not guaranteed to work from all technologies; most notably, it does not work from landlines. In order to encourage use of 000, mobile telephones imported commercially into Australia are required to be programmed to treat 000 in the same fashion as 112 (i.e. dialling with key lock enabled, use of any carrier, preferential routing, etc.). On older or privately imported (e.g. roaming from another country) telephones, 000 may not receive such preferential treatment.

=== Local Rate and FreeCall numbers (13, 180) ===
Australia uses the free call prefix 1800 for 10-digit freecall numbers. This is similar to the prefix 1–800 in the North American Numbering Plan, but 1800 in Australia is a "virtual area code". Prior to the introduction of 8-digit numbers, the free call code was 008. There are also seven-digit freecall numbers beginning with 180–the only numbers currently allocated begin with 1802.

The 13 and 1300 numbers are known as Local Rate Numbers or SmartNumbers. They are also known as priority 13, and priority 1300 numbers. These work across large areas (potentially the whole of Australia) and charge the caller only a low cost, routing the call to the appropriate place in a given area. For example, a company could have the number 139999 and have the telephone company set it up so that calls made in Melbourne would route to their Melbourne number, calls made in Brisbane to their Brisbane number, and calls made anywhere else in Australia route to their Sydney number, all at a local charge cost to the caller. 13 numbers were not available before the introduction of the current 8-digit local numbering plan. Businesses looking for local callers tend to connect to a "1300" number. Note that these numbers are called "Local Rate" and not "Local" numbers, so do not necessarily cost the same as a local call: Indeed, many (landline and mobile) phone plans do not even include them in the "included" credit and/or charge them at a higher rate than "normal" numbers.

Though promoted as "local call rate" calls, calls to 13 and 1300 numbers cost more than a local call fee for those people using VoIP and having all local and national calls free.

1800, 1300 and 13 numbers are reverse charge networks. Other than the length of the number, the differences between a 13 number and a 1300 number is that the shorter number has a higher fee for the owner of the number: there should be no difference in cost to the caller. A call to an 1800 is free when dialled from a landline, and mobile phones since 2014. It depends on the individual mobile plan as how 13 and 1300 numbers are charged: all plans no longer charge for 1800 but 13 and 1300 may still be charged at a high rate, or outside included calls.

These numbers "forward" to a geographic or mobile number. The recipient is usually charged at a set rate per second for each call, depending on plan and destination.

=== Premium numbers (19) ===
190x (not to be confused with 0198) is the prefix for premium rate services (e.g. recorded information, competition lines, psychics, phone sex, etc.). (Prior to the introduction of 8-digit local numbers, the prefix was 0055.) 190 numbers incur a rate as charged by the provider – either at a per-minute rate (limited at $5.50 per minute) or a fixed rate (up to $38.50 per call). The latter method is most often used for fax-back services, where a timed charge is not appropriate. Costs of 190 calls for competitions involving chance are also often limited by state legislation to $0.55 per call. (In the previous numbering plan, 0055 numbers were limited to three bands: Premium Rate, Value Rate and Budget Rate, with per minute rates of $0.75, $0.60 and $0.40 respectively.)

Other numbers beginning with 20 are used for premium-rate SMS services. These were originally trialled using the 188 prefix. These can range from a standard SMS cost (usually 25c), up to 55c for competition use, to several dollars for other uses, such as unique bid auctions.

== International access ==
The main international prefix is 0011. (E.164 international format is supported from phones with the ability to dial the '+' symbol.)

There are other codes for using a non-default carrier or a special plan:

- 0014 routes through the Primus network
- 0018 routes through the Telstra network
- 0019 routes through the Optus network

Formerly, 0015 routed through Telstra on a special mode for international faxing. Telstra has retired this code. The prefix 0018 was previously used by Telstra to offer international calls charged in 30-minute blocks, at a potential discount to the default per-minute charge; this offer was retired in October 2012.

Carrier selection codes (14xx) are now also used, and carrier pre-selection is widely used.

== Carrier selection codes ==
These four-digit numbers are dialled before the destination number to complete and bill a call by a carrier other than the subscriber's service provider. For example, to use TPG to call a number in Tokyo, Japan, subscribers would dial 1414 0011 81 3 xxxx xxxx, or to use Optus to call a number in Perth they would dial 1456 08 xxxx xxxx. It is not clear if all these prefixes will actually work. Not all carriers have interconnect agreements with each other

- 1410 – Telstra
- 1411 – Telstra
- 1412 – TPG (Was Chime)
- 1413 – Telstra
- 1414 – TPG (Was AAPT)
- 1415 – Vodafone
- 1422 – Premier Technologies
- 1423 – TPG (was Soul Pattinson)
- 1428 – Verizon Australia
- 1431 – Vodafone Hutchison
- 1434 – Symbio Networks
- 1441 – TPG (was Soul Pattinson)
- 1447 – TransACT
- 1450 – Pivotel
- 1455 – Netsip
- 1456 – Optus
- 1464 – TPG (Was Agile)
- 1466 – Primus
- 1468 – Telpacific
- 1469 – Lycamobile
- 1474 – Powertel
- 1477 – Vocus
- 1488 – Symbio Networks
- 1499 – VIRTUTEL

== Supplementary control services ==
=== Works on both landlines and mobiles ===
- 1831 – Block Caller ID sending
- 1832 – Unblock Caller ID sending

=== Works on mobiles only ===
- #31# - Block Caller ID sending
- *31# - Unblock Caller ID sending

== Other numbers and codes ==
=== Feature codes – Telstra ===
These codes are only true for Telstra-infrastructure based landline phones

- Call waiting
  - *#43# – Check call waiting status
  - *43# – Enable call waiting
  - #43# – Disable call waiting
  - *44 – Dial before a number to disable call waiting for the call duration (Enabled on Ericsson 'AXE' and Alcatel 'S12' based exchanges)
- Call forward – immediate
  - *#21# – Check Call Forward Immediate Status
  - *21 [forward number] # – Enable Call Forward Immediate on all incoming calls
  - #21# – Disable Call Forward Immediate
- Call forward – busy
  - *#24# – Check Call Forward Busy Status
  - *24 [forward number] # – Enable Call Forward when line is Busy for incoming calls
  - #24# – Disable Call Forward Busy
- Last call return
  - *10# – Check last missed call
  - 0# – Redial last number (This is only enabled on Ericsson based Exchanges)
- Call control
  - *30 [old pin] * [new pin] * [new pin] # – Setup/change current Call Control PIN
  - *#33# – Check Call Control Status
  - *33 [pin] # – Enable Call Control on line
  - #33 [pin] # – Disable Call Control on line

=== Test numbers ===
- Telstra Landline Test numbers
  - 12722123 – Playback the last connected or current landline number (add 1832 in front for private numbers)
  - 12722199 – Ringback the current landline number
- Telstra payphone test numbers
  - 12722101 - takes 1¢ per metering pulses
  - 0488076353 - test the SMS function of the phone
- Optus landline test numbers
  - 1272312 – Playback the last connected or current landline number
  - 1272399 – Ringback the current landline number
- From other subscribers including VoIP providers
  - 1800801920 – Playback the last connected or current landline number
- Other
  - 12711 – Current long-distance Carrier Name

== Historical numbering plans ==
=== 1960s ===
Up to this time, the maximum size of an Australian telephone number was six digits.

Until the early 1960s, the first one or two digits of telephone numbers in metropolitan areas were alphabetic, with each letter representing a distinct number on the telephone dial. Each one-letter or two-letter code signified an exchange within an urban area. Rural and regional areas typically relied on manual exchanges, or only one automatic exchange for the whole town, so rural and regional numbers did not feature these letter prefixes. The use of a letter-number combination also served as a memory aid as it was easier to remember than a string of digits in the days when such things were not as common.

Unlike the three (or fewer) letters associated with each of the numbers on the dials of telephones of the UK Director telephone system, which was used in London and other large British cities, Australia used a system of letters associated with the ten digits available on a telephone dial, where each of these letters were chosen because their "name" (when pronounced, in English) could not be confused with any of the other nine letters of the English/Latin alphabet which were also used.

Since the initial digits of 1 and 0 (ten) were not used, this gave the telephone company concerned up to 8 regions with main exchanges and up to ten sub-exchanges in each metropolitan area – a total of up to 80 individual exchanges of 10,000 numbers in each with up to only 800,000 individual "numbers" in any metropolitan area concerned. This limited capacity led to the need for a seven- or eight-digit numbering system, to allow for more "numbers" within a given area.

Because of the growth of the telephone network, Australia now has eight-digit telephone numbers within four areas.

This former alphanumeric scheme was significantly different from the current system used for SMS messages.

The former alphanumeric assignments were: A = 1, B = 2, F = 3, J = 4, L = 5, M = 6, U = 7, W = 8, X = 9, Y = 0

The letters did not relate to any exchange name. For example, the exchange prefix for Essendon was FU (which translated to 37 and later became the 37x [then 937x] exchange used by the whole City of Essendon [which became the City of Moonee Valley in late 1994]). Although Melbourne city numbers began with 6, it was only rarely, and probably by accident, that any other exchanges had matching letters. Numbers using the old alphanumeric scheme were written as ab.xxxx, for example FU 1234 (the actual train of digits sent to the phone was 371234) or MW 5550 (685550). Seven-digit numbers started appearing as early as 1960, which were always numerical. There were still some six-digit numbers and at least one five-digit number in Melbourne as late as 1989, but by the 1990s, they all had been converted to seven-digit numbers. Footscray used six-digit numbers in exchange code 68 until 1987, when they were changed to 687 or 689.

The old call back number was 199, and could be used on public payphones and private lines. This was moved to a new number 12722199.

=== 1990s ===
0055 numbers were previously premium-rate numbers, but have been moved into 190 numbers before 1999.

The original toll-free area code was 008, but the format was changed to 1800.

Directory assistance used various numbers: 013 for local calls, 0175 for other national calls, and 0103 for international. The two domestic numbers have been replaced with 1223, while 0103 was replaced with 1225. Other numbers for directory assistance, often with a call connection option, exist depending on the carrier.

011 was initially the code for the operator, 0011 later became the international exit code.

014 was originally the number for the time, (later 1104), which was changed to 1194 in 1976.

0176 was originally the code for the operator when calling from a Public Telephone. It became the code for the reverse-charge call operator, which was moved to 12550. Alternatively 3rd-party companies exist. See Collect call#Australia

007 was originally the code for the MTS Service (mobile telephone service). This service was only available in capital cities and restricted to motor vehicles only. The system was of Japanese origin (NEC), originally 120ch later 180ch. The units were quite bulky and heavy, especially the 120ch units. The service was only provided by Telecom Australia (later Telstra) from 1980 to 1988 when the cellular mobile network (018) commenced.

=== 2010s ===
Many old numbers were officially removed from the Telecommunications Numbering Plan in the 2015 version, whether in the replacement version or a previous variation.

- 018 AMPS phone numbers are completely removed.
- 0500 Personal Numbers are removed.
- Unused prefixes such as 114 mass calling service are removed.

== See also ==
- Former Australian dialling codes
- Telecommunications in Australia
- Telephone numbers in Norfolk Island
