= Lake Meran =

- Town
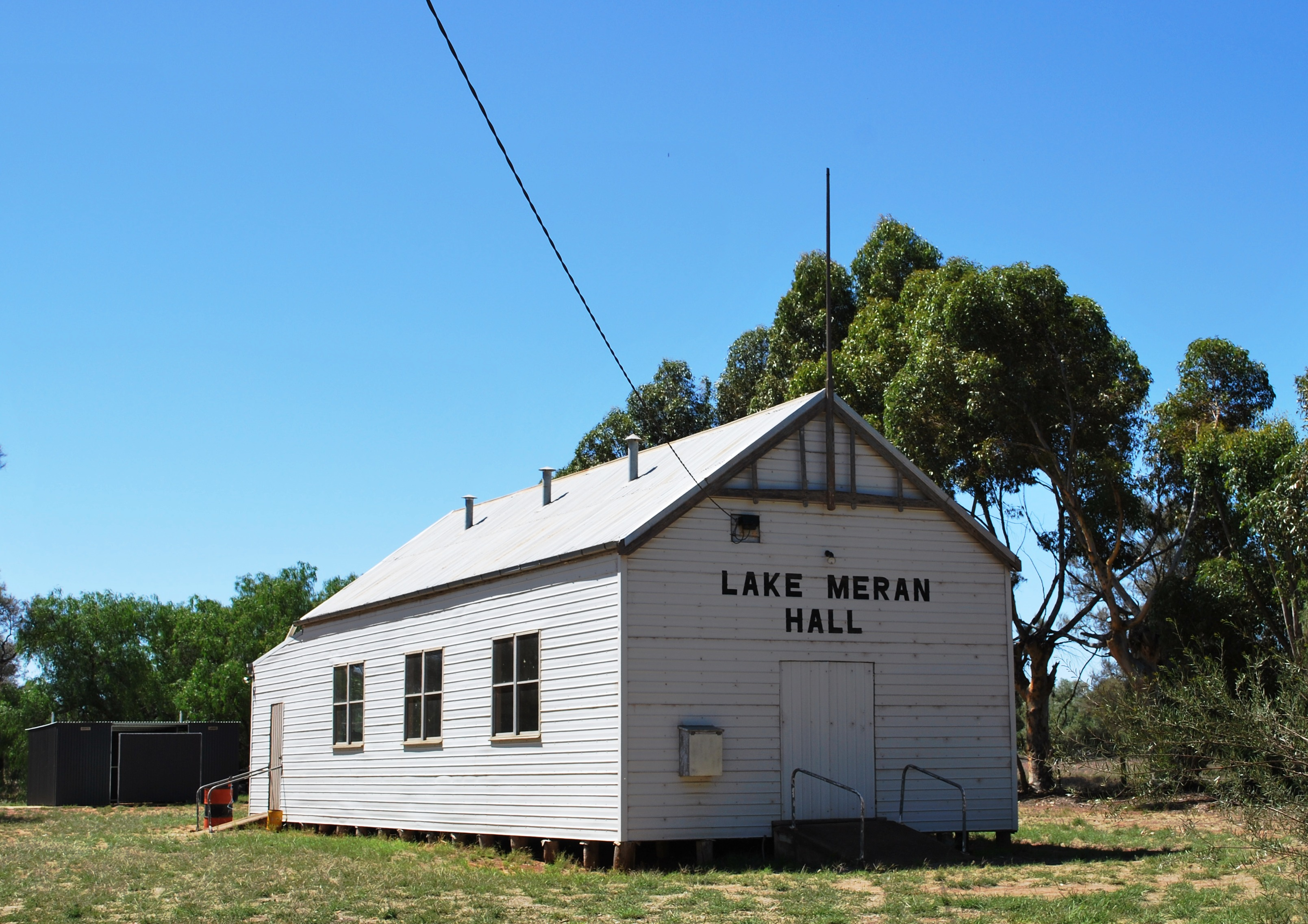
- Public hall at Lake Meran

- Coordinates: 35°52′2″S 143°48′13″E
- Country: Australia
- State: Victoria
- LGAs: Shire of Gannawarra; Shire of Loddon
- Location: 285 km (177 mi) NW of Melbourne; 78 km (48 mi) S of Swan Hill; 23 km (14 mi) S of Kerang

Government
  - State electorate: Murray Plains
  - Federal division: Murray

Population
  - Total: 22 (SAL 2021)
- Postcode: 3579

Lake Meran is a locality in north central Victoria, Australia. The locality is shared between the Shire of Gannawarra and the Shire of Loddon, 285 kilometres (177 mi) north west of the state capital, Melbourne.

At the 2016 census, Lake Meran had a population of 23. This had reduced to 22 at the 2021 census.
