= Mystic Park =

Mystic Park Victoria
- Coordinates: 35.5566709°S 143.7226468°E
- Population: 212 (SAL 2021)
- Established: 1870s
- Postcode(s): 3579
- LGA(s): Shire of Gannawarra
- State electorate(s): Murray Plains
- Federal division(s): Mallee

Mystic Park is a locality in the Australian state of Victoria. It straddles the Murray Valley Highway between Kerang and Swan Hill, and falls within the Shire of Gannawarra local government area. Mystic Park had a population of 181 people at the time of the 2016 Australian census.

Mystic Park contains Lake Tutchewop, part of the Kerang Wetlands, and also includes the northern and western shores of Kangaroo Lake (the lake itself falls within the Lake Charm locality). It also takes in the Tutchewop Wildlife Reserve, the Mystic Park Bushland Reserve, and part of the Koorangie Wildlife Reserve. Agriculture has historically been the main occupation in Mystic Park, although in recent years tourism has become more important – notably the Kangaroo Lake Caravan Park and the Mystic Park Vineyard (owned by Brown Brothers).

The origins of Mystic Park's name are unknown, but the locality takes its name from the Mystic Park Hotel, which was established in 1879 on the stagecoach run to Swan Hill. A station on the Piangil railway line was opened in 1890, and a township was gazetted in 1893. At one point, the locality supported a church, a school, a mechanics' institute, and a football club (which competed in the Kerang and District Football League).

John Gorton, the Prime Minister of Australia from 1968 to 1971, lived in Mystic Park for much of his life. His father, John Rose Gorton, headed a syndicate called Lake Kangaroo Estates, which bought land in the area in 1920 and developed citrus orchards. His son took over the management of the property in 1936.
