= Murray River bridge, Barham =

Murray River Bridge, Barham
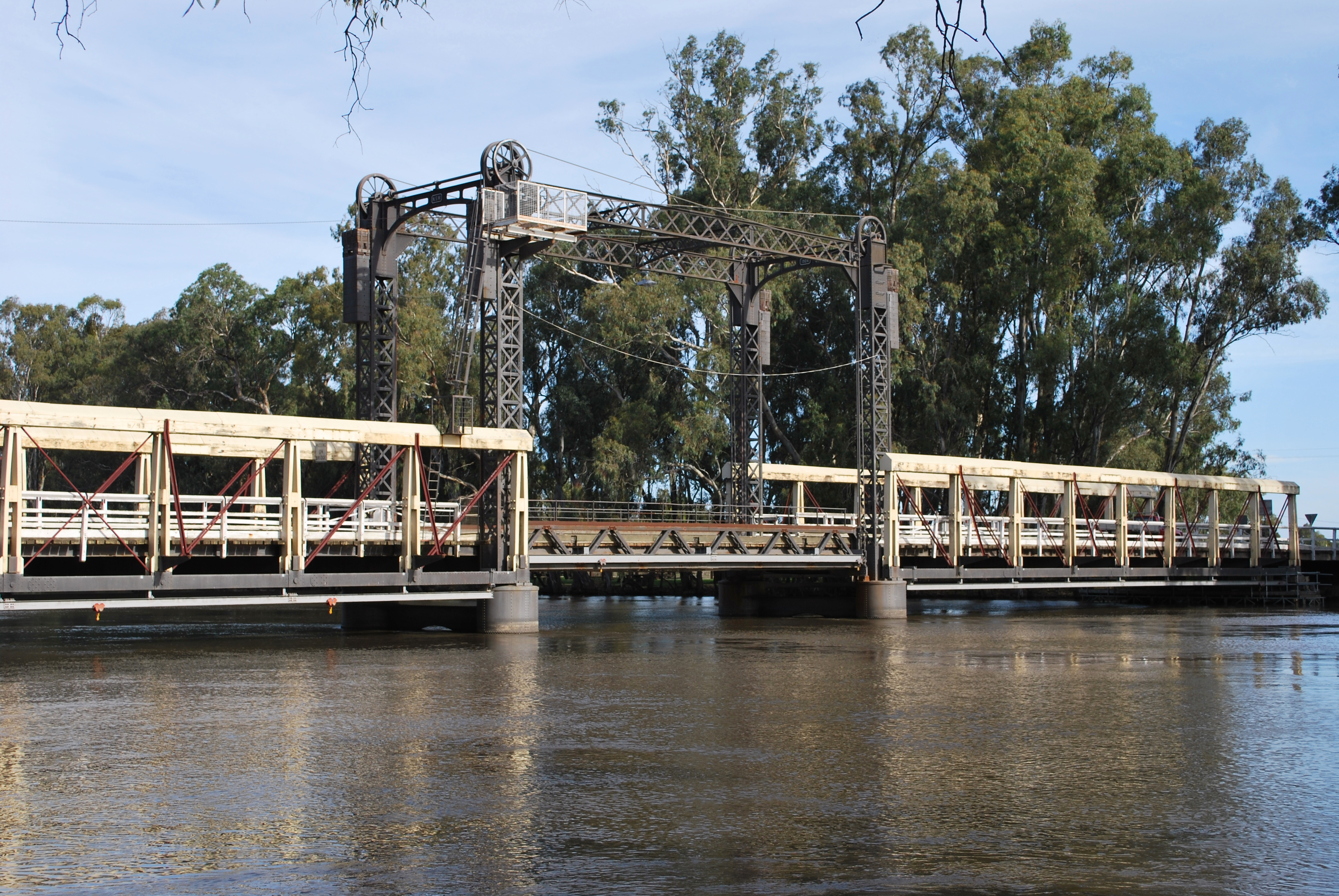
- Barham Bridge in 2012
- Coordinates: 35°37′50″S 144°07′29″E
- Carries: Main Road
- Crosses: Murray River
- Locale: Barham, Murray River Council, New South Wales, Australia
- Begins: Barham, New South Wales
- Ends: Koondrook, Victoria
- Other names: Barham Bridge over Murray River; Barham Bridge; Barham Koondrook Bridge
- Owner: Murray River Council
- Preceded by: Echuca-Moama Bridge
- Followed by: Gonn Crossing Bridge

Characteristics
- Design: Truss bridge with a lift span
- Material: Timber
- Trough construction: Steel and timber
- Pier construction: Timber and cast iron
- Longest span: 17.8 m (58 ft)
- No. of spans: 3
- Clearance below: 5.1 m (17 ft)

History
- Designer: Ernest de Burgh
- Contracted lead designer: NSW Department of Public Works
- Constructed by: John Monash and Anderson
- Construction start: 1903
- Opened: 1905

New South Wales Heritage Register
- Official name: Barham Bridge over Murray River; Barham bridge
- Type: State heritage (built)
- Designated: 20 June 2000
- Reference no.: 1456
- Type: Road Bridge
- Category: Transport – Land
- Builders: John Monash and Anderson

Victorian Heritage Register
- Official name: Barham Koondrook Bridge
- Type: Registered place
- Designated: 10 July 2008
- Reference no.: 0795
- Category: Transport – Road

Location
- Interactive map of Murray River Bridge, Barham

The Murray River bridge is a heritage-listed road bridge that carries Main Road across the Murray River located at Barham in the Murray River Council local government area of New South Wales, Australia. It was designed by Department of Public Works and built in 1904 by John Monash. The bridge is also known as the Barham Bridge over Murray River, the Barham bridge, and the Barham Koondrook Bridge.

The bridge is owned by the Murray River Council and was added to the New South Wales State Heritage Register on 20 June 2000 and to the Victorian Heritage Register on 10 July 2008.

== History ==
The Murray around Barham was settled by graziers, mainly from Victoria, in the 1840s. By 1850 all the really desirable water-frontages on both sides of the Murray had been taken up as far upstream as Barham while the open plain to the north in New South Wales was only notionally divided into undeveloped backblocks. Barham station itself (named after the maiden name of the wife of the first grazier, E. B. Green, had a 32-kilometre (20 mi) frontage on the Murray, carrying a modest head of cattle in the mid-Victorian period under a series of owners. With similar developments on the Loddon River, which converges with the Murray north of Barham, a crossing of the Murray was needed and a ferry was provided for stock and people.

In 1902 it was agreed that a bridge with a lift span should be built, thanks to local political pressure on both the NSW and Commonwealth governments. The first piles were driven in 1903 and the bridge opened in 1905.

Barham lies in the Wakool Irrigation District, opened in 1935. This was the first such district in the state, with extensive, partial irrigation designed to provide water for the maximum number of graziers to ensure a regular supply of fattened lambs. In 1949 an intensive irrigation area within the district made rice farming feasible, increasing local heavy traffic. there have been particularly severe problems from salientian, however, in the last quarter-century.

== Description ==
Barham bridge is timber truss, steel lift span, bridge, generally two lanes wide across the Murray River between Barham in NSW and Koondrook in Victoria. The main axis of the bridge is north—south.

There are three main spans including one lift span, supported on cast iron piers. There is one timber approach span at each end, supported on timber trestle piers. The 17.8-metre (58 ft) lift span is of lattice steel construction, both the for tower and the main girder. The design is similar to that developed by Percy Allan and first used at Swan Hill nine years previously, but shows some variation from that layout, and those used later at Tooleybuc and Abbotsford bridges.

The Barham Bridge has the counterweights on the main axis side of the supporting columns, while the others have them on the cross axis. The cross girders on the top of the structure are unusually curved and decorated. The changes may be due to the fact that the design was undertaken under Ernest de Burgh who had also changed timber trusses from Percy Allan's design. The two other main spans of 31.7 metres (104 ft) are timber trusses of the de Burgh Type. This truss was developed by Ernest de Burgh as an improvement on the Allan truss. The truss used a steel bottom chord. The truss supports steel cross girders and steel longitudinal stringers. The deck is timber. The 9.1-metre (30 ft) approach spans are timber girders on timber trestle piers. The deck is timber. A section of the deck has been segregated for pedestrians with a kerb and handrail on all spans except the lift span. The main piers are cast ion and are protected by cofferdams. The bridge has a clearance over normal water level of 5.1 metres (17 ft).

=== Condition ===
As at 15 May 1998, the bridge was in good condition having been extensively repaired in recent years, due to a major rehabilitation of the timber trusses.

== Heritage listing ==
As at 28 June 2005, Barham bridge has significance under all four criteria - Historical, Aesthetic, Technical and Social. The significance of the bridge lies in its location, for setting, and materials. The form and setting have aesthetic and social significance. The bridge may have higher overall significance as a member of the Murray Crossing Group, as a representative of a rare example of a representative type.

Barham Bridge over Murray River was listed on the New South Wales State Heritage Register on 20 June 2000 having satisfied the following criteria.

The place is important in demonstrating the course, or pattern, of cultural or natural history in New South Wales.

The Barham Bridge has historical significance as a rare example of a type of bridge which shows the evolving pattern of bridge design in Australia. The De Burgh timber bridge was only built for a brief period between 1899 and 1904. There are only nine remaining, and only two associated with lift spans, Barham and Cobram. These two bridges are also the only examples of De Burgh's lift spans. The bridge was built by Monash and Anderson. The bridge has historical significance through the association of John Monash with the bridge. Monash is arguably both one of Australia's most famous engineers, as well as one of the country's most famous soldiers.

The place is important in demonstrating aesthetic characteristics and/or a high degree of creative or technical achievement in New South Wales.

The Barham bridge has aesthetic significance due to its outstanding setting and landmark qualities. The bridge provides a gateway to NSW and the town of Barham. It dominates the towns due to its height and mass, providing the major landmark in the district. The setting is particularly fine, situated on the edge of the town and crossing the river amidst parklike lands and trees.

The place has strong or special association with a particular community or cultural group in New South Wales for social, cultural or spiritual reasons.

The Barham bridge has high significance to the local and district residents as the gateway between Barham and Koondrook, NSW and Victoria. As the towns are not large there is considerable commuting across the bridge for services that are not duplicated in both towns. The bridge also provides a focal point between town and river. The river is the main geographical feature in the area, and the centre for most recreation. The bridge acts as a reminder of river transport and attracts large crowds wherever river traffic passes through. For example, one lady, who has seen hundreds of river boats pass through the bridge, still rushes to see each new opening.

=== Victorian Heritage Register ===
Despite the bridge being located in New South Wales, (Note: The registration on the Victorian Heritage Register limits its registration to "The part of the place known as the Barham-Koondrook Bridge over the Murray River at Koondrook located in Victoria, including the bridge and its support structure, the abutments, the roads and embankments marked (B1) on Diagram 795 held by the Executive Director.") on 20 July 2008, the bridge was added to the statutory Victorian Heritage Register on the basis of its structural significance and for its historical significance in facilitating intercolonial trade between the Colony of New South Wales and the Colony of Victoria.

=== Engineering heritage ===
The bridge received a Historic Engineering Marker from Engineers Australia as part of its Engineering Heritage Recognition Program.

== See also ==
- List of crossings of the Murray River
- List of bridges in Australia

== Notes ==
| Next bridge upstream | Murray River | Next bridge downstream |
| Echuca-Moama Bridge (road) | Murray River bridge, Barham | Gonn Crossing Bridge |
