= Telephone numbers in Norfolk Island =

Telephone numbers in Norfolk Island use the following dialling codes:

- Country code: 672
- Area code: 3
- International call prefix: 00
- Fixed numbers are of the format 672 3 2x xxx.
- Mobile numbers are of the format 672 3 5x xxx.

The country code 672 is also used for the Australian Antarctic Territory. The code was also used for Christmas Island and the Cocos Keeling Islands, using area codes 2 and 4 respectively. In October 1994, they were migrated to the +61 country code, under area code 091 (using exchange prefixes 62 for Christmas Island and 64 for the Cocos Islands). These numbers have since migrated to the 08 9162 and 08 9164 ranges.

Until 1975, country code 672 was assigned to Portuguese Timor. When that territory was annexed by Indonesia in 1975, it used the Indonesian country code +62 and the area code 390. However, following the end of Indonesian rule in 1999, the code +672 9 was used under an interim arrangement to reach numbers in the territory.

== See also ==
- Telephone numbers in Australia
