= Shire of Gannawarra =

Coordinates: 35°43′00″S 143°55′00″E

- Local government area
- Location in Victoria

- Interactive map of Shire of Gannawarra
- Country: Australia
- State: Victoria
- Region: Loddon Mallee
- Established: 1995
- Council seat: Kerang

Government
  - Mayor: Cr Charlie Gillingham
  - State electorate: Murray Plains
  - Federal division: Mallee

Area
  - Total: 3,735 km^{2} (1,442 sq mi)

Population
  - Total: 10,683 (2021)
  - Density: 2.8602/km^{2} (7.4080/sq mi)
- Gazetted: 20 January 1995
- Website: Shire of Gannawarra
LGAs around Shire of Gannawarra
Swan Hill	Murray River (NSW)	Murray River (NSW)
Buloke	Shire of Gannawarra	Murray River (NSW)
Buloke	Loddon	Campaspe

The Shire of Gannawarra is a local government area in Victoria, Australia, located in the northern part of the state. It covers an area of 3,735 square kilometres (1,442 mi^{2}) and, in August 2021 had a population of 10,683. It includes the towns of Cohuna, Kerang, Koondrook, Leitchville and Quambatook.

The Shire is governed and administered by the Gannawarra Shire Council; its seat of local government and administrative centre is located at the council headquarters in Kerang, it also has a service centre located in Cohuna.

The Shire is named after the locality of Gannawarra, roughly equidistant from the two main towns, which is in turn named for a 19th-century pastoral run. The underlying meaning of the name is variously given as "running water" or "geese".

== History ==
The Shire of Gannawarra was formed in 1995 from the amalgamation of the Borough of Kerang, the vast bulk of the Shire of Kerang and Shire of Cohuna, giving the new LGA a mixed economic base – dairying country to the east of Kerang township and dryland cropping to the west. The Borough and Shire of Kerang advocated for the inclusion of the Shire of Gordon in the combined LGA, but Gordon was staunchly opposed to a northward merger. Gordon was instead amalgamated into the Loddon Shire.

The new LGA required a name that did not show bias towards Kerang or Cohuna. Under the Local Government Board's initial proposal, it was to be called the "Shire of Illoura", a word meaning "still waters" in an unspecified Aboriginal language that, following inquiries with local groups, was found not to be local to the area. Representatives from the three municipalities agreed to put forward "Gannawarra" – the name of the pastoral run that once covered much of the eastern part of the Shire – to the Board as an alternative.

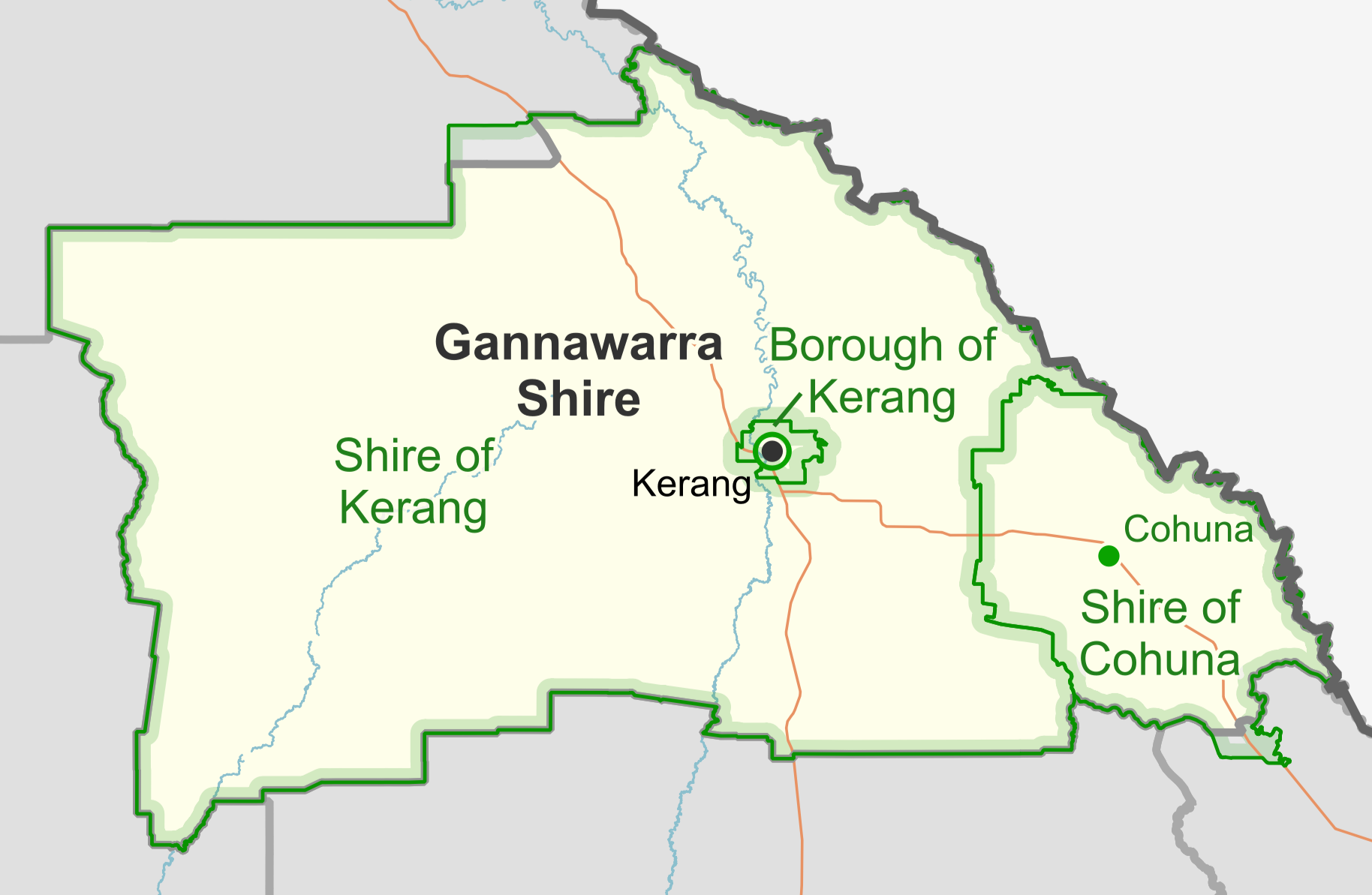
Gannawarra Shire's predecessor LGAs (green) as they were in 1994. The administrative centres of the former LGAs are marked by green dots.

== Geography ==
The northeastern border of the shire is the Murray River. The Loddon River flows through the shire, feeding into the Murray. The Gunbower State Forest is a significant source of river red gum timber, supplying a historic sawmill in Koondrook. Gunbower Island is the largest inland island in the local area. It is between the Murray River and the Gunbower Creek, an anabranch of the Murray.

The western part of the shire is predominantly used for cereal grain production. The north and east have significant dairying and milk processing. Tourists are attracted to the local rivers (for fishing) and lakes (for bird watching and water sports).

== Council ==
=== Current composition ===
The council is composed of four wards and seven councillors, with three councillors elected to represent the Patchell Ward, two councillors elected to represent the Yarran Ward and one councillor per remaining ward elected to represent each of the other wards. The current council was elected in October 2020.

Ward	Party	Councillor	Notes
Avoca	Independent	Charlie Gillingham	
Murray	Independent	Ross Stanton	
Patchell	Independent	Kelvin Burt	
Patchell	Independent	Travis Collier	
Patchell	Independent	Jane E. Ogden	
Yarran	Independent	Garner Smith	
Yarran	Independent	Keith Link	

=== Administration and governance ===
The council meets in the council chambers at the council headquarters in the Kerang Municipal Offices, which is also the location of the council's administrative activities. It also provides customer services at both its administrative centre in Kerang, and its service centre in Cohuna.

== Townships and localities ==
In the 2021 census, the shire had a population of 10,683, up from 10,549 in the 2016 census.

Population
Locality	2016	2021
Appin	11	12
Appin South^	29	38
Bael Bael	8	10
Beauchamp^	44	44
Benjeroop	45	56
Budgerum East	5	0
Burkes Bridge	14	14
Cannie	22	16
Capels Crossing	35	54
Cohuna	2,428	2,415
Cullen	39	36
Daltons Bridge	37	57
Dingwall	81	99
Fairley	15	14
Gannawarra	94	110
Gonn Crossing	56	50
Gredgwin^	15	13
Horfield^	91	93
Keely	60	57
Kerang	3,893	3,960
Kerang East	40	44
Koondrook	991	1,101
Koroop	80	63
Lake Charm	168	147
Lake Meran^	23	22
Lalbert	151	138
Leitchville^	558	576
Macorna^	87	67
Macorna North	20	31
McMillans	93	87
Mead	89	102
Meatian^	20	19
Meering West^	13	12
Milnes Bridge	24	31
Mincha West	32	16
Murrabit	201	230
Murrabit West	45	41
Myall	10	17
Mystic Park	181	212
Ninyeunook	11	13
Normanville	35	34
Oakvale	21	19
Pine View	0	4
Quambatook	249	229
Reedy Lake	26	26
Sandhill Lake	5	9
Teal Point	60	54
Tittybong^	3	3
Towaninny^	11	4
Tragowel	104	83
Wandella	69	67
Wee Wee Rup	35	31
Westby	26	27

^ - Territory divided with another LGA

== See also ==
- List of places on the Victorian Heritage Register in the Shire of Gannawarra
