= Koondrook =

- Town
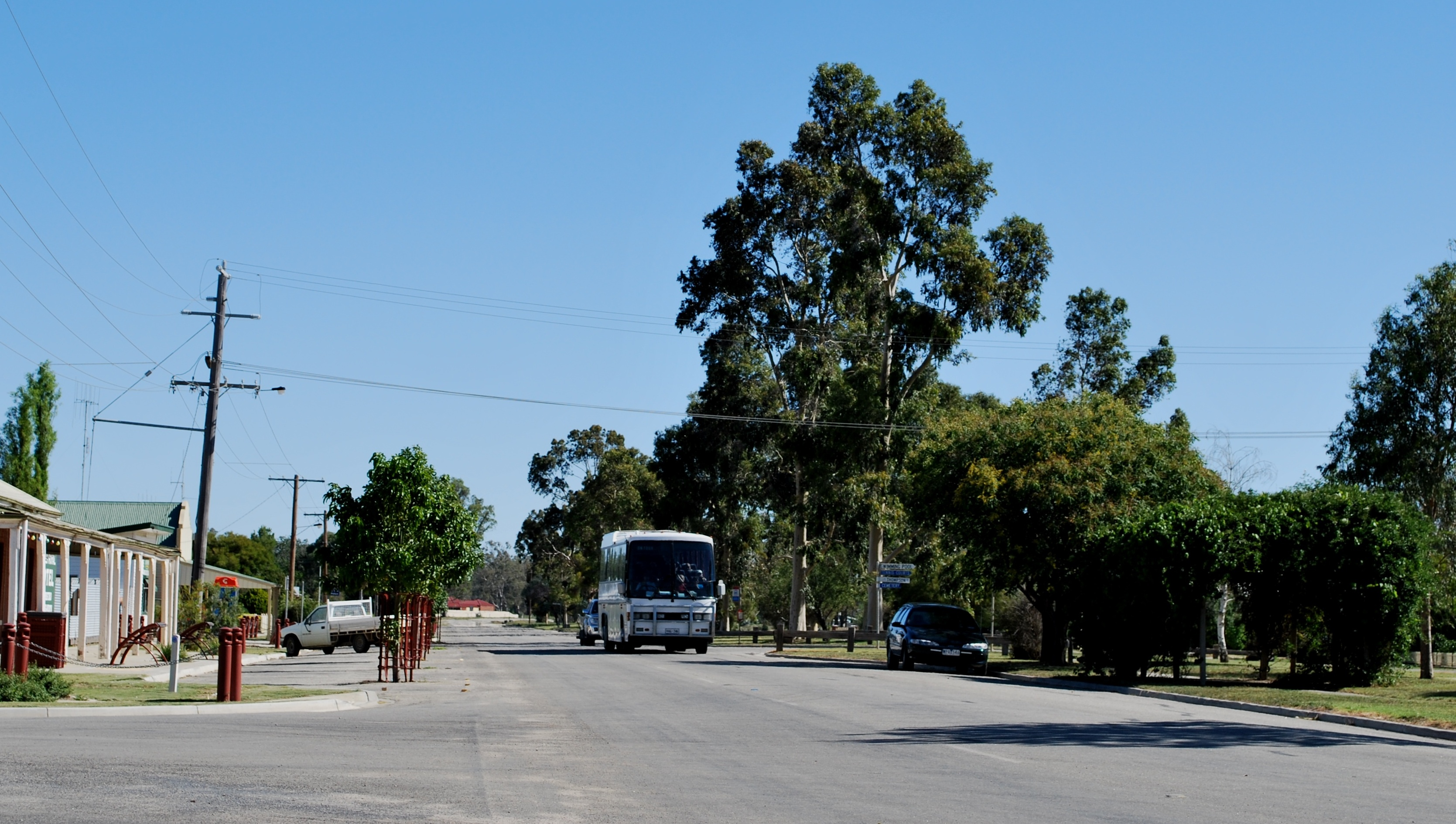
- Main street of Koondrook

- Coordinates: 35°38′32″S 144°07′53″E
- Country: Australia
- State: Victoria
- LGA: Shire of Gannawarra
- Location: 301 km (187 mi) from Melbourne; 74 km (46 mi) from Swan Hill; 24 km (15 mi) from Kerang; 2 km (1.2 mi) from Barham (NSW)

Government
  - State electorate: Murray Plains
  - Federal division: Mallee
- Elevation: 78 m (256 ft)

Population
  - Total: 832 (2016 census)
- Time zone: UTC+10
  - Summer (DST): UTC+11
- Postcode: 3580
- Mean max temp: 22.2 °C (72.0 °F)
- Mean min temp: 8.4 °C (47.1 °F)
- Annual rainfall: 391.4 mm (15.41 in)
- Website: Koondrook

Koondrook (/ˈkʊndrʊk/ KUUN-druuk) is a town situated on the Murray River, Victoria, Australia. The town is located in the Shire of Gannawarra local government area, 301 kilometres (187 mi) north west of the state capital, Melbourne. At the 2016 census, Koondrook had a population of 832.

== History ==
The Barrapa Barrapa Indigenous Australians are believed to have occupied the Koondrook area, prior to European settlement commencing in 1843. The Post Office opened on 1 March 1879. In 1889 the Kerang-Koondrook Tramway was opened, linking the town to the Victorian railway network. The tramway was officially closed on 3 March 1981.

There was a Koondrook Baptist Church founded in 1/9/1889.

== Present ==
Koondrook is connected by a bridge to its twin town of Barham in the neighbouring state of New South Wales. Industry in the area includes dairying on the river flats, and citrus production using irrigation supplied from the Murray River. Timber from the surrounding state forests is used in the production of redgum timber and furniture. Citrus grown in the area is used by a local processing plant to produce 'The Great Australian Squeeze' organic orange juice, which is distributed in local grocery stores and across Australia in an agreement with Woolworths supermarket.

Fishing and camping in the area popular activities for tourists in the surrounding state forests. The forests are important breeding areas for colonial waterbirds and are visited by migratory birds.

The town, in conjunction with neighbouring township Barham across the Murray, has an Australian rules football team competing in the Central Murray Football League.

== Notable people ==
Melbourne Cup winning jockey Roy Higgins and AFL premiership player Brent Guerra were born in Koondrook. Melbourne cup winning jockey Jye McNeil also grew up in Koondrook.

== Climate ==
The Köppen Climate Classification subtype for this climate is BSk (cold semi-arid), with generally low rainfall year-round. The nearest climate data can be found at Kerang.
