= Electoral district of Murray Plains =

State electoral district of Victoria, Australia

Murray Plains Victoria—Legislative Assembly
- Interactive map of electoral district boundaries from the 2022 state election
- State: Victoria
- Created: 2014
- MP: Peter Walsh
- Party: The Nationals
- Namesake: Murray River
- Electors: 46,924 (2018)
- Area: 11,921 km^{2} (4,602.7 sq mi)
- Demographic: Rural
- Coordinates: 35°46′S 143°50′E
Electorates around Murray Plains:
Mildura	Shepparton	New South Wales
Mildura	Murray Plains	New South Wales; Shepparton
Ripon	Bendigo East	Euroa

The electoral district of Murray Plains is an electoral district of the Victorian Legislative Assembly in Australia. It was created in the redistribution of electoral boundaries in 2013, and came into effect at the 2014 state election.

The district was created due to the abolition of the districts of Swan Hill and Rodney. It is centred on the Murray River cities of Swan Hill and Echuca, including the towns of Kerang, Lake Boga, Cohuna and Rochester. It covers the Swan Hill, Gannawarra, Loddon and Campaspe local government areas.

Murray Plains was contested in the 2014 election by the sitting National Party MP for the abolished district of Swan Hill, Peter Walsh, who retained the seat, and was re-elected in 2018.

== Members ==
Member	Party	Term
Peter Walsh	National	2014–present

== Election results ==
2022 Victorian state election: Murray Plains
Party	Candidate	Votes	%	±%
National	Peter Walsh	24,831	61.8	+1.4
Labor	Damien Hurrell	7,543	18.8	−0.6
Family First	Cameron Macpherson	2,575	6.4	+6.4
Freedom	Katia Bish	1,752	4.4	+4.4
Greens	John Brownstein	1,560	3.9	−0.4
Ind. (Fusion)	Andrea Otto	1,022	2.5	+2.5
Animal Justice	Glenys Leung	908	2.3	+2.3
Total formal votes		40,181	93.8	−0.7
Informal votes		2,647	6.2	+0.7
Turnout		42,828	88.1	−2.4
Two-party-preferred result
National	Peter Walsh	29,483	73.4	−0.5
Labor	Damien Hurrell	10,698	26.6	+0.5
National hold		Swing	−0.5	
