= Andrzej Trybulec =

Polish mathematician and computer scientist

Andrzej W. Trybulec
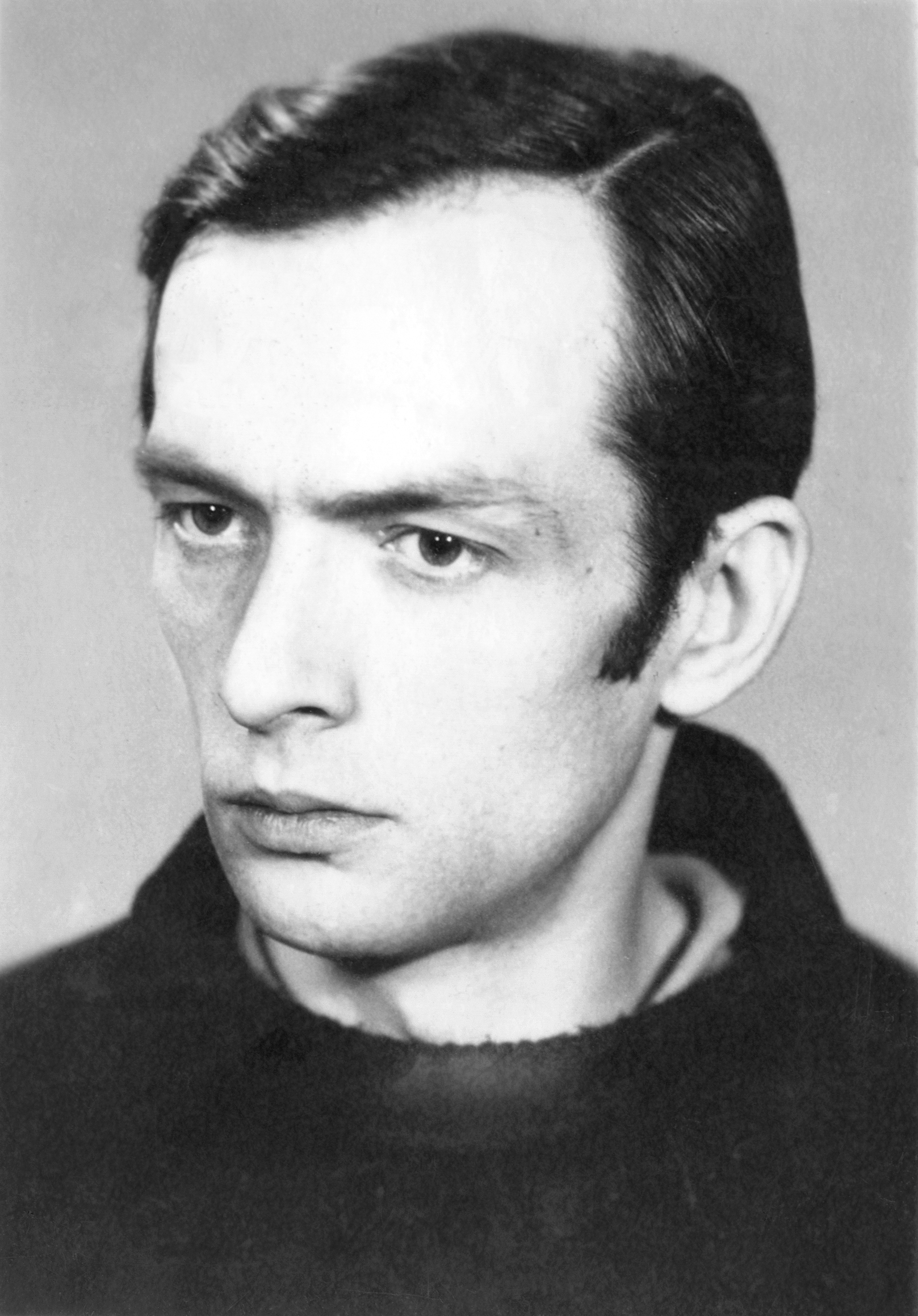
- Trybulec ca. 1975
- Born: 29 January 1941; Kraków, Poland
- Died: 11 September 2013 (aged 72); Białystok, Poland
- Education: University of Warsaw
- Known for: Mizar system Computer-oriented formalization of mathematics
- Spouse: Zinaida Trybulec
- Children: Wojciech A. Trybulec; Michał J. Trybulec
- Relatives: Krystyna Kuperberg; Włodzimierz Kuperberg; Greg Kuperberg
- Awards: Kapitsa Medal, Russian Academy of Natural Sciences, 1995; Śleszyński Prize, Mizar Users Association, 1994; Golden Order of Merit, 1988; Silver Order of Merit, 1978; Golden Medal of Merit of the Warsaw Voivodeship, 1978
- Scientific career
- Fields: Mathematics; Information Science; Topology; Computational linguistics Semantics
- Workplaces: University of Białystok; University of Warsaw; Warsaw University of Technology; Polish Academy of Sciences; University of Connecticut; All-Russian Scientific and Technical Information Institute
- Thesis: On some properties of the movable compacta (1975)
- Doctoral advisor: Karol Borsuk

Andrzej Wojciech Trybulec (29 January 1941 in Kraków, Poland – 11 September 2013 in Białystok, Poland) was a Polish mathematician and computer scientist noted for work on the Mizar system.

== Early years ==
His parents Jan W. Trybulec and Barbara H. Kurlus both were professional pharmacists who owned a chemists shop in a small town Szczucin near the city of Tarnów in the south-eastern Poland where they dispensed medicines. He went to high school in Ruda Śląska and then, on his own initiative, he transferred to a prestigious high school in Kraków, where he matriculated. He studied mathematics at the University of Warsaw, from 1964 to 1966 he lectured at the Chair of Geometry, in 1966 he graduated to the magister degree. Until 1967 he lectured at the Institute of Mathematics at the University of Warsaw, from 1967 to 1971 he was an assistant professor at the Warsaw University of Technology, since 1971 he worked at the Institute of Library and Information Science of the University of Warsaw. In September and October 1973, Trybulec was a visiting professor to the All-Russian Scientific and Technical Information Institute (VINITI) in Moscow, then the USSR, where he invented the idea of machine-readability of a mathematical text. He earned the doctoral degree in 1974 from the Institute of Mathematics of the Polish Academy of Sciences under Karol Borsuk.

== Research work ==
Trybulec's first mathematical papers were in the various topological and metric space topics pioneered by Karol Borsuk. In parallel to his generic topological research, he also worked in computational linguistics and semantics of programming languages. Applying the framework of Tarski–Grothendieck set theory axioms, essentially the Zermelo–Fraenkel set theory supplemented by the Tarski axiom with all the objects being sets and eliminated notion of class, together with the first-order logic of the Gentzen-Jaśkowski natural deduction, in 1973 he designed the formalization system Mizar consisting of a formal language for writing mathematical definitions and proofs, a proof assistant, able to mechanically check proofs written in this language. Although the first presentation of the Mizar system on 14 November 1973 at a seminar in the Institute of Library Science and Scientific Information was an ideology understood as a visionary speculation rather than research project, his idea was later developed by himself and his collaborators to the Mizar Mathematical Library (MML), a library of formalized mathematics which can be used in the proof of new theorems and the world’s largest repository of formalized and computer-checked mathematics. Since 1978 until his death, he had lectured as a professor at the Institute of Computer Science at the University of Białystok, while in 1984-1985 hold visiting professorship at the Department of Computer Science and Engineering of the University of Connecticut. He published a number of articles, mostly with the journal Formalized Mathematics dedicated to MML contributions.

== Publications ==
- Asperti, Andrea; Bancerek, Grzegorz; Trybulec, Andrzej, eds. (2004), Mathematical Knowledge Management: Proceedings of Third International Conference, MKM 2004, Białowieża, Poland, September 19-21, 2004, Lecture Notes in Computer Science 3119, New York: Springer, ISBN 978-3-540-23029-8

== See also ==
- Mizar system
- Timeline of Polish science and technology
- List of Polish mathematicians
- List of Polish people
