= QED manifesto =

Proposal for a computer-based database of all mathematical knowledge

The QED manifesto was a proposal for a computer-based database of all mathematical knowledge, strictly formalized and with all proofs having been checked automatically. "QED" is an abbreviation in Latin traditionally placed at the end of mathematical proofs.

== Overview ==
The idea for the project arose in 1993, mainly under the impetus of Robert Boyer. The goals of the project, tentatively named QED project or project QED, were outlined in the QED manifesto, a document first published in 1994, with input from several researchers. Explicit authorship was deliberately avoided. A dedicated mailing list was created, and two scientific conferences on QED took place, the first one in 1994 at Argonne National Laboratories and the second in 1995 in Warsaw organized by the Mizar group.

The project seems to have dissolved by 1996, never having produced more than discussions and plans. In a 2007 paper, Freek Wiedijk identifies two reasons for the failure of the project. In order of importance:

- Very few people are working on formalization of mathematics. There is no compelling application for fully mechanized mathematics.
- Formalized mathematics does not yet resemble real, traditional mathematics. This is partly due to the complexity of mathematical notation, and partly to the limitations of existing theorem provers and proof assistants; the paper finds that the major contenders, Mizar, HOL, and Rocq, have serious shortcomings in their abilities to express mathematics.

Nonetheless, QED-style projects are regularly proposed. The Mizar Mathematical Library formalizes a large portion of undergraduate mathematics, and was considered the largest such library in 2007. Similar projects include the Metamath proof database and the mathlib library written in Lean.

In 2014 the Twenty years of the QED Manifesto workshop was organized as part of the Vienna Summer of Logic.

== See also ==
- Formalism (mathematics)
- Mathematical knowledge management
- POPLmark, a more modest project in programming language theory
