= Binary alphabet =

Binary alphabet may refer to:

- The members of a binary set in mathematical set theory
- A 2-element alphabet, in formal language theory
- ASCII

== See also ==
- Binary numeral system
