= Mathematical formalism =

Mathematical formalism can mean:

- Formalism (philosophy of mathematics), a general philosophical approach to mathematics
- Formal logical systems, in mathematical logic, a particular system of formal logical reasoning
