= Theorem prover =

Theorem prover may refer to:

- Automated theorem prover
- Proof assistant, an interactive theorem prover
