= NBE =

NBE may refer to:

- National Bank of Egypt
- National Bank of Ethiopia
- National Board of Examinations, an Indian medical license board
- New Bach Edition
- Nordbahn Eisenbahngesellschaft, a German railway company
- Negative buoyant energy
- Non business entity
- Norfolk Board of Education, a former school district in Ontario, Canada
- Enfidha-Hammamet International Airport's IATA code
- Normalisation by evaluation
