= Seifert conjecture =

In mathematics, the Seifert conjecture states that every nonsingular, continuous vector field on the 3-sphere has a closed orbit. It is named after Herbert Seifert. In a 1950 paper, Seifert asked if such a vector field exists, but did not phrase non-existence as a conjecture. He also established the conjecture for perturbations of the Hopf fibration.

The conjecture was disproven in 1974 by Paul Schweitzer, who exhibited a $C^1$ counterexample. Schweitzer's construction was then modified by Jenny Harrison in 1988 to make a $C^{2+\delta}$ counterexample for some $\delta > 0$. The existence of smoother counterexamples remained an open question until 1993 when Krystyna Kuperberg constructed a very different $C^\infty$ counterexample. Later this construction was shown to have real analytic and piecewise linear versions. In 1997 for the particular case of incompressible fluids it was shown that all $C^\omega$ steady state flows on $S^3$ possess closed flowlines based on similar results for Beltrami flows on the Weinstein conjecture.
