= Krystyna Kuperberg =

Polish-American mathematician

Krystyna M. Kuperberg
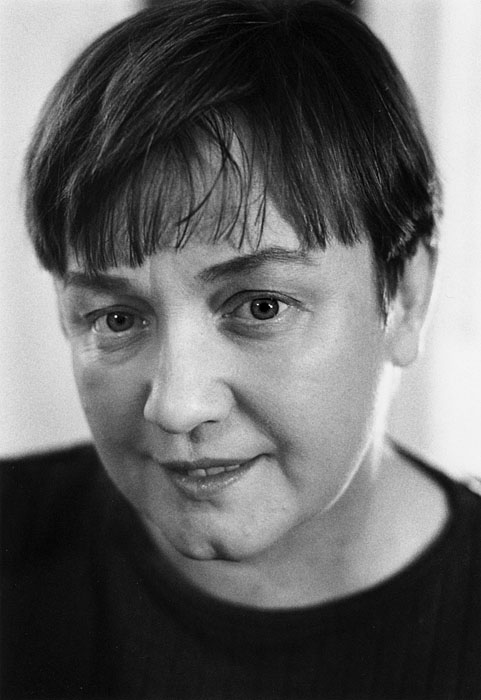
- Krystyna Kuperberg in 1990
- Born: Krystyna Maria Trybulec; July 17, 1944 (age 82); Tarnów, Poland
- Education: University of Warsaw (M.S.); Rice University (Ph.D.)
- Known for: Smooth counter-example to the Seifert conjecture
- Spouse: Włodzimierz Kuperberg
- Children: Greg Kuperberg
- Relatives: Andrzej Trybulec
- Awards: Alfred Jurzykowski Prize (1995); Noether Lecture (1999); Fellow of the American Mathematical Society (2012); AWM Service Award (2013)
- Scientific career
- Fields: Topology; Dynamical systems
- Workplaces: Auburn University
- Doctoral advisors: Karol Borsuk; William Jaco
- Website: webhome.auburn.edu/~kuperkm/

Krystyna Maria Kuperberg (born Krystyna M. Trybulec; 17 July 1944) is a Polish-American mathematician who currently works as a professor of mathematics at Auburn University. She is a foreign member of the Polish Academy of Arts and Sciences and a fellow of the American Mathematical Society.

== Early life and family ==
Her parents, Jan W. and Barbara H. Trybulec, were pharmacists and owned a pharmacy in Tarnów. Her older brother is Andrzej Trybulec. Her husband Włodzimierz Kuperberg and her son Greg Kuperberg are also mathematicians, while her daughter Anna Kuperberg is a photographer.

== Education and career ==
After attending high school in Gdańsk, she entered the University of Warsaw in 1962, where she studied mathematics. Her first mathematics course was taught by Andrzej Mostowski; later she attended topology lectures of Karol Borsuk and became fascinated by topology.

After obtaining her undergraduate degree, Kuperberg began graduate studies at Warsaw under Borsuk, but stopped after earning a master's degree. She left Poland in 1969 with her young family to live in Sweden, then moved to the United States in 1972. She finished her Ph.D. in 1974, from Rice University, under the supervision of William Jaco. In the same year, both she and her husband were appointed to the faculty of Auburn University. From 1996 to 1998, Kuperberg served as an American Mathematical Society Council member at large. In 1998, she was elected to the AMS Editorial Boards Committee.

== Contributions ==
In 1987 she solved a problem of Bronisław Knaster concerning bi-homogeneity of continua. In the 1980s she became interested in fixed points and topological aspects of dynamical systems. In 1989 Kuperberg and Coke Reed solved a problem posed by Stanislaw Ulam in the Scottish Book. The solution to that problem led to her 1993 work in which she constructed a smooth counterexample to the Seifert conjecture. She has since continued to work in dynamical systems.

== Recognition ==
At Auburn University, Kuperberg was awarded an Alumni Professorship for five years. In 1995 Kuperberg received the Alfred Jurzykowski Prize from the Kościuszko Foundation. Her major lectures include an American Mathematical Society Plenary Lecture in March 1995, a Mathematical Association of America Plenary Lecture in January 1996, and an International Congress of Mathematicians invited talk in 1998. In 2007, Kuperberg was awarded the Sierpiński Medal conferred jointly by the Polish Mathematical Society and the University of Warsaw. In 2012, she became a fellow of the American Mathematical Society. In 2025, she was elected as a foreign member of the Polish Academy of Arts and Sciences.

== Selected publications ==
- Kuperberg, Krystyna (1994). "A smooth counterexample to the Seifert conjecture". Annals of Mathematics. (2). 140 (3): 723–732. doi:10.2307/2118623. JSTOR 2118623. MR 1307902.
- Kuperberg, Greg; Kuperberg, Krystyna (1996). "Generalized counterexamples to the Seifert conjecture". Annals of Mathematics. (2). 143 (3): 547–576. arXiv:math/9802040. doi:10.2307/2118536. JSTOR 2118536. MR 1394969. S2CID 16309410.
