= Mark Allen (software developer) =

American software engineer, game programmer, and game designer

Mark Allen is an American software engineer, game programmer and game designer. As a student at the University of California, San Diego, Allen used UCSD Pascal to develop a 6502 interpreter for the Pascal language in 1978, along with Richard Gleaves. This work later became the basis for Apple Pascal in 1979.

Later, Allen developed a number of well-received video games for the Apple II, including Stellar Invaders, Sabotage, and Pest Patrol. Sabotage, in particular, became a classic Apple II game and sparked numerous clones such as Paratrooper. One such clone, Parachute, was preloaded software on early iPods that had displays.
