= Matita =

Proof assistant

- Matita logo
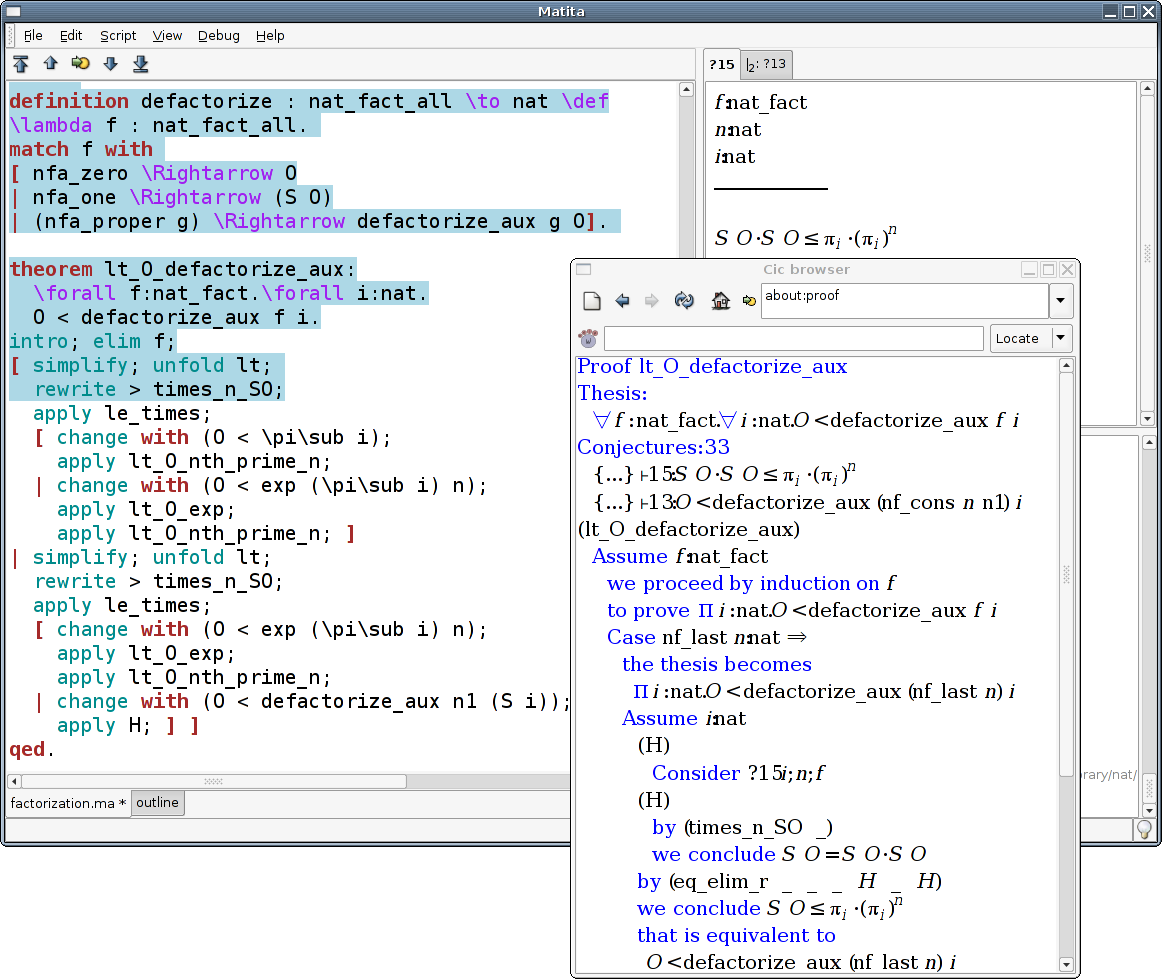
- The Matita proof authoring interface.
- Developer: Matita team
- Release: 1999
- Written in: OCaml
- Operating system: Linux
- Available in: English
- Type: Theorem proving
- License: GPL
- Website: http://matita.cs.unibo.it at the Wayback Machine (archived 2023-02-04)

Matita is an experimental proof assistant under development at the Computer Science Department of the University of Bologna. It is a tool aiding the development of formal proofs by human–machine collaboration, providing a programming environment where formal specifications, executable algorithms and automatically verifiable correctness certificates naturally coexist.

Matita is based on a dependent type system known as the calculus of (co)inductive constructions (a derivative of the calculus of constructions), and is compatible, to some extent, with Rocq.

The word "matita" means "pencil" in Italian (a simple and widespread editing tool). It is a reasonably small and simple application, whose architectural and software complexity is meant to be mastered by students, providing a tool particularly suited for testing innovative ideas and solutions. Matita adopts a tactic-based editing mode; (XML-encoded) proof objects are produced for storage and exchange.

== Main features ==
Existential variables are native in Matita, allowing a simpler management of dependent goals.

Matita implements a bidirectional type inference algorithm exploiting both inferred and expected types.

The power of the type inference system (refiner) is further augmented by a mechanism of hints that helps in synthesizing unifiers in particular situations specified by the user.

Matita supports a sophisticated disambiguation strategy based on a dialog between the parser and the typechecker.

At the interactive level, the system implements a small step execution of structured tactics allowing a much better management of the proof development, and naturally leading to more structured and readable scripts.

== Applications ==
Matita has been employed in CerCo (Certified Complexity): a FP7 European Project focused on the development of a formally verified, complexity preserving compiler from a large subset of C to the assembly language of a MCS-51 microprocessor.

== Documentation ==
The Matita tutorial provides a pragmatic introduction to the main functionalities of the Matita interactive theorem prover, offering a guided tour through a set of non-trivial examples in the field of software specification and verification.

== See also ==
- Curry–Howard correspondence
- Interactive theorem proving
- Intuitionistic type theory
- List of proof assistants
