= Richard Bornat =

British computer scientist and engineer (1944–2026)

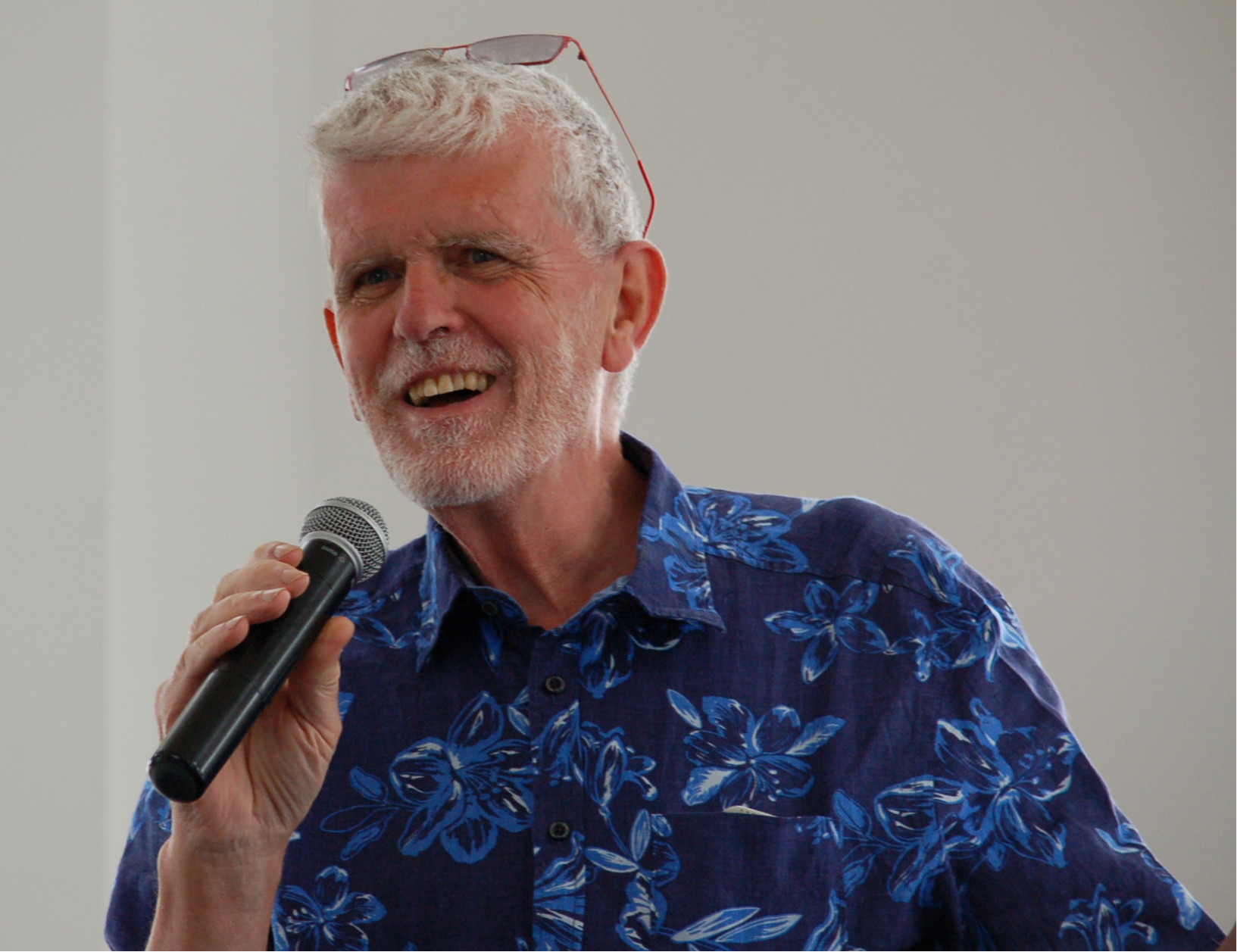
- Bornat at 70th Birthday
- Born: 29 June 1944; England
- Died: 8 January 2026 (aged 81); England
- Occupation: Professor
- Known for: Jape (software)
- Title: Professor

Academic work
- Discipline: Computer scientist
- Sub-discipline: Formal methods
- Institutions: Queen Mary, University of London; Middlesex University
- Doctoral students: Samson Abramsky
- Main interests: Program proving
- Notable works: Understanding and Writing Compilers: A Do It Yourself Guide (1979); Programming from First Principles (1987)
- Website: cs.mdx.ac.uk/prof-richard-bornat

Richard Bornat (29 June 1944 – 8 January 2026) was a British author and researcher in the field of computer science. He was a Professor of Computer Programming at Middlesex University. Previously, he was at Queen Mary, University of London.

== Background ==
Bornat was the son of Charles Bornat, an English architect. From 1977 to 2002, Richard was an academic at Queen Mary, University of London. He then moved to Middlesex University.

== Research ==
Bornat's research interests included program proving in separation logic. His focus is on the proofs themselves, as opposed to any logical underpinnings. Much of the work involved discovering ways to state the properties of independent modules in a manner that makes their composition into useful systems conducive.

Bornat (in conjunction with Bernard Sufrin of the Oxford University Computing Laboratory) developed Jape, a "proof calculator"; he was involved in research on the usability of this tool for exploration of novel proofs.

Richard Bornat's PhD students included Samson Abramsky in the early 1980s.

In 2004, one of Bornat's students developed an aptitude test to "divide people up into programmers and non-programmers before they ever come into contact with programming." The test was first given to a group of students in 2005 during an experiment on the use of mental models in programming. In 2008 and 2014, Bornat partially retracted some of the claims, impugning its validity as a test for programming capability.

Over the last few years, Bornat worked on Quantum Programming. He implemented Qtpi, which is based on Gay and Nagarajan's CQP (Communicating Quantum Processes), using OCaml.

== Publications ==
Bornat published a book entitled "Understanding and Writing Compilers: A Do It Yourself Guide" (first published in 1979), which is regarded as one of the most extensive resources on compiler development. Although it has been out of print for some time, he made it available as an online edition.

Other publications from Bornat include:

- R. Bornat; 1987; Programming from First Principles; Prentice Hall International Series in Computer Science; ISBN 0-13-729104-3.
- Richard Bornat and Harold Thimbleby; 1989; The life and times of ded, display editor; in J.B. Long & A. Whitefield (eds); Cognitive Ergonomics and Human-Computer Interaction; Cambridge University Press; pp. 225–255.
- Richard Bornat and Bernard Sufrin; 1999; Animating Formal Proof at the Surface: The {Jape} Proof Calculator; The Computer Journal; Vol. 42; no. 3; pp. 177–192.
- Aczel, J. C., Fung, P., Bornat, R., Oliver, M., O'Shea, T., & Sufrin, B.; 1999; Influences of Software Design on Formal Reasoning; in Brewster, S., Cawsey, A. & Cockton, G. (Eds.) Proceedings of IFIP TC.13 International Conference on Human-Computer Interaction INTERACT '99; Vol. 2; pp. 3–4; Swindon, UK, British Computer Society; ISBN 1-902505-19-0.
- R. Bornat; 2000; Proving Pointer Programs in Hoare Logic; in Backhouse & Oliveira (eds) MPC 2000; LNCS 1837; pp. 102–126.
- C. Calcagno, P. O'Hearn, R. Bornat; 2002; Program Logic and Equivalence in the Presence of Garbage Collection. To appear in Theoretical Computer Science special issue on Foundations.
- R. Bornat, J. Boender, F. Kammueller, G. Poly and R. Nagarajan; 2020; Describing and Simulating Concurrent Quantum Systems, Tool Demonstration Paper, In TACAS ’20: 26th International Conference on Tools and Algorithms for the Construction and Analysis of Systems, Dublin, Ireland, April 25–30, 2020. Lecture Notes in Computer Science.
- Bornat, R., Nagarajan, R.; (2023); Describing and Animating Quantum Protocols, In: Palmigiano, A., Sadrzadeh, M. (eds), Samson Abramsky on Logic and Structure in Computer Science and Beyond. Outstanding Contributions to Logic, vol 25. Springer, Cham.

He also gave lively talks.
