= Greg Kuperberg =

Polish American mathematician

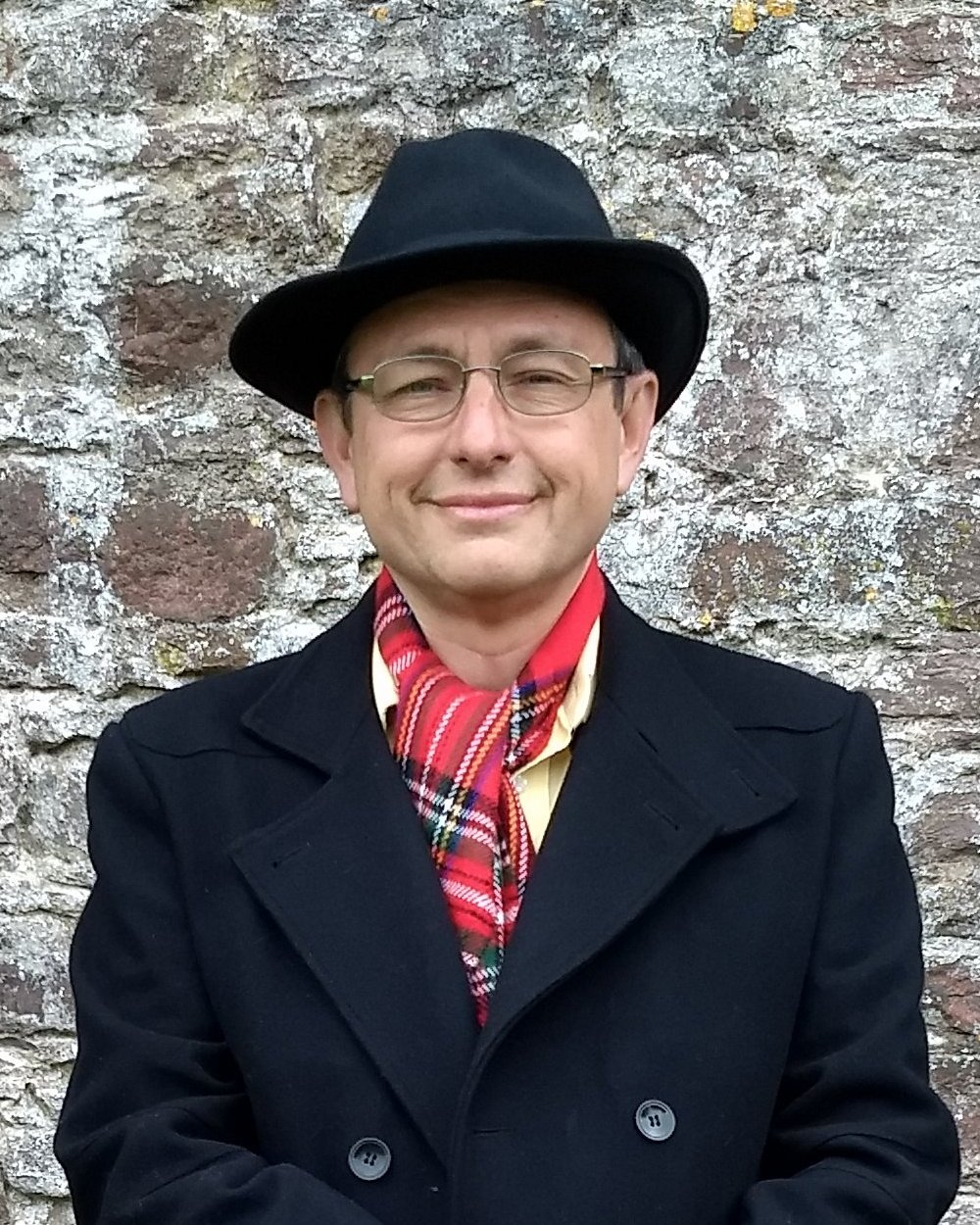
- Born: July 4, 1967 (age 59)
- Education: Harvard University; University of California, Berkeley
- Awards: Fellow of the American Mathematical Society (2012)
- Scientific career
- Workplaces: Yale University; UCD
- Thesis: Invariants of Links and 3-Manifolds via Multilinear Algebra and Hopf Algebras (1991)
- Doctoral advisor: Andrew Casson

Greg Kuperberg (born July 4, 1967) is a Polish-born American mathematician known for his contributions to geometric topology, quantum algebra, and combinatorics. Kuperberg is a professor of mathematics at the University of California, Davis.

== Biography ==
Kuperberg is the son of two mathematicians, Krystyna Kuperberg and Włodzimierz Kuperberg. He was born in Poland in 1967, but his family emigrated to Sweden in 1969 due to the 1968 Polish political crisis. In 1972, Kuperberg's family moved to the United States, eventually settling in Auburn, Alabama.

Kuperberg wrote three computer games for the IBM Personal Computer in 1982 and 1983 (which were published by Orion Software): Paratrooper, PC-Man and J-Bird. (video game clones of Sabotage, Pac-Man and Q*bert, respectively)

He enrolled at Harvard University in 1983 and received a bachelor's degree in 1987. He was ranked Top 10 in the 1986 William Lowell Putnam Mathematical Competition. Upon leaving Harvard, Kuperberg studied at the University of California, Berkeley under Andrew Casson, receiving a Ph.D. in geometric topology and quantum algebra in 1991. From 1991 until 1992, Kuperberg was a NSF postdoctoral fellow and adjunct assistant professor at Berkeley, and from 1992 to 1995 held a Dickson Instructorship at the University of Chicago. From 1995 through 1996, Kuperberg was Gibbs Assistant Professor at Yale University after which he joined the mathematics faculty at the University of California, Davis. In 2012 he became a fellow of the American Mathematical Society.

Kuperberg is married to physicist Rena Zieve, who is a professor of physics at UC Davis.

== Selected publications ==
Kuperberg has over fifty publications, including two in the Annals of Mathematics.

- Kuperberg, Greg (1994). "The quantum G_{2} link invariant". International Journal of Mathematics. 5 (1): 61–85. arXiv:math/9201302. doi:10.1142/S0129167X94000048.
- Kuperberg, Greg (1996). "Non-involutory Hopf algebras and 3-manifold invariants". Duke Mathematical Journal. 84: 83–129. arXiv:q-alg/9712047. doi:10.1215/S0012-7094-96-08403-3. S2CID 15086645.
- with Krystyna Kuperberg: Kuperberg, Greg; Kuperberg, Krystyna (1996). "Generalized counterexamples to the Seifert conjecture". Annals of Mathematics. Second Series. 144 (3): 547–576. arXiv:math/9802040. doi:10.2307/2118536. JSTOR 2118536. S2CID 16309410.
- Kuperberg, Greg (2002). "Symmetry classes of alternating-sign matrices under one roof". Annals of Mathematics. Second Series. 156 (3): 835–866. arXiv:math/0008184. doi:10.2307/3597283. JSTOR 3597283. S2CID 7965653.
- Kuperberg, Greg (2005). "A subexponential-time quantum algorithm for the dihedral hidden subgroup problem". SIAM Journal on Computing. 35 (1): 170–188. arXiv:quant-ph/0302112. doi:10.1137/S0097539703436345. S2CID 15965140.
- Kuperberg, Greg (2006). "Numerical cubature using error-correcting codes". SIAM Journal on Numerical Analysis. 44 (3): 897–907. arXiv:math/0402047. doi:10.1137/040615572. S2CID 18689951.
- Kuperberg, Greg (1 May 2014), "Knottedness is in NP, modulo GRH", Advances in Mathematics, 256: 493–506, arXiv:1112.0845, doi:10.1016/j.aim.2014.01.007
