= Paratrooper (video game) =

1982 video game

- Developer: Greg Kuperberg
- Publisher: Orion Software
- Platform: IBM PC
- Release: 1982; 44 years ago
- Genre: Fixed shooter
- Mode: Single-player

Paratrooper is a 1982 fixed shooter written by Greg Kuperberg and published by Orion Software as a self-booting disk for IBM PC compatibles. It is based on a 1981 Apple II game called Sabotage developed by Mark Allen.

== Gameplay ==
The player controls a gun turret at the bottom of the screen. The turret can swivel to cover a large area of the screen, but cannot move from its base. Helicopters fly across the screen at varying heights, dropping paratroopers. The gun may fire multiple shots at once, and the shots may destroy helicopters or shoot paratroopers. Paratroopers may be disintegrated by a direct hit, or their parachutes may be shot, in which case they will plummet to earth (splattering and dying, killing any paratrooper onto whom they fall). Periodically, jets may fly by and drop bombs; the jets and bombs may be shot as well.

The player earns points by shooting helicopters, paratroopers, jets, and bombs. Firing a shell costs the player one point, so if one is playing for score, there is an incentive to conserve ammo.

The game ends when the player's turret is hit by a bomb, or when four paratroopers safely land on either the left or right of the turret (that is four on one side, not four total). Once this happens, they are able to build a human pyramid and climb up to the turret and blow it up.

Paratrooper
"Paratrooper intro"
Paratrooper video game intro music, as played through the PC Speakers.

The game's intro music is an interpretation of a brief section of Johann Sebastian Bach's Toccata and Fugue in D minor, BWV 565, played through the PC speaker.

== Reception ==
PC Magazine gave Paratrooper 10 points out of 18. The magazine described it as "a well-executed but unexceptional game [which] quickly loses its appeal after a dozen or so plays". In 1984 Softline readers named Paratrooper the worst IBM program of 1983.

== Legacy ==
In 1992, Software Creations released a remake of the game called Night Raid for MS-DOS.
