= Sabotage (video game) =

1981 video game

- Developer: Mark Allen
- Publisher: On-Line Systems
- Designer: Mark Allen
- Platform: Apple II
- Release: 1981
- Genre: Fixed shooter
- Mode: Single-player

Sabotage is a fixed shooter video game for the Apple II written by Mark Allen and published by On-Line Systems in 1981.

== Gameplay ==
Gameplay screenshot

The player controls a gun turret at the bottom of the screen by either keyboard, paddle control, or a single axis of a joystick. The turret can swivel to cover a large area of the screen, but cannot move from its base. Helicopters fly across the screen at varying heights, progressively lower over time, dropping paratroopers. Waves consist of helicopters coming at progressively lower altitudes, a brief rest, then a wave of jets.

The player earns points by shooting helicopters (5 points), paratroopers (2 points), jets (5 points), and bombs (25 points). Firing a shell costs the player one point, so if one is playing for score, there is an incentive to conserve ammo. The score never drops below zero.

The game ends when the player's turret is hit by a bomb, when a single paratrooper lands directly on the turret base, when three paratroopers safely land atop each other immediately adjacent to the turret base (allowing the third to jump onto the base), or when four paratroopers safely land on either the left or right of the turret (that is four on one side, not four total). If four land on a side, they are able to build a human pyramid and climb up to the turret and blow it up once the sky is clear.

== Legacy ==
The Sabotage concept has been cloned a number of times:

- Commando Raid (Atari 2600, 1982)
- M.A.D. (Atari 2600, 1982) "Missile Attack and Defense"
- Paratrooper (IBM PC, 1982)
- Airborne! (Black and White Macintosh, 1985) by Silicon Beach Software
- Incoming! (Atari 8-bit computers, 1986) by Conrad Tatge in ANALOG Computing magazine
- ParaShooter! (Apple IIGS, 1989) by Lane Roathe
- Night Raid (IBM PC, 1992)
- Parachute, (preloaded on the third-generation, 2003) iPod and later models.
