= Studies in Logic, Grammar and Rhetoric =

- Discipline: Philosophy
- Language: English
- Edited by: Halina Święczkowska, Kazimierz Trzęsicki

Publication details
- Publisher: University of Białystok (Poland)
- Frequency: Quarterly

Standard abbreviations
- ISO 4: Stud. Log. Gramm. Rhetor.

Indexing
- ISSN: 0860-150X

Links
- Journal homepage

Studies in Logic, Grammar and Rhetoric is a journal of philosophy, publishing articles of diverse streams in English.

The journal is abstracted and indexed by DOAJ, ERIH PLUS, SCOPUS, CEJSH (The Central European Journal of Social Sciences and Humanities) e Index Copernicus.

As of 2024, it has registered a H-index of 17.

== See also ==
- List of philosophy journals
