= Włodzimierz Kuperberg =

Polish-American mathematician, Auburn U

- Born: January 19, 1941
- Other names: Wlodek Kuperberg
- Education: University of Warsaw (MS 1963; PhD, 1969)
- Spouse: Krystyna Kuperberg
- Children: Greg Kuperberg
- Scientific career
- Fields: Mathematics
- Institutions: Stockholm University; University of Houston; Auburn University
- Thesis: Dimension-theory properties of the ANR spaces (1969)
- Doctoral advisor: Karol Borsuk
- Website: https://webhome.auburn.edu/~kuperwl/

Włodzimierz "Wlodek" Kuperberg (born January 19, 1941) is a professor of mathematics at Auburn University, with research interests in geometry and topology.

== Biography ==
Although Kuperberg is Polish-American, he was born in what is now Belarus, where his parents and older siblings had traveled east to escape World War II. In 1946, the family returned to Poland, resettling in Szczecin, where Kuperberg grew up. He began his studies at the University of Warsaw in 1959, and received his Ph.D. from the same institution in 1969, under the supervision of Karol Borsuk. During his time at Warsaw, he published three high school textbooks in Polish. Kuperberg left Poland due to the anti-semitic aspects of the 1967-1968 Polish political crisis, and worked at Stockholm University until 1972, when he assumed a visiting position at the University of Houston. In 1974, Kuperberg took a position at Auburn where he remains.

Kuperberg married mathematician Krystyna Kuperberg in 1964, and their son Greg Kuperberg is also a professional mathematician, while their daughter Anna Kuperberg is a photographer.

== Research highlights ==
Although much of Kuperberg's early mathematical work is in topology, he is best known today for his work in geometry, and in particular on packing and covering problems. His first paper in this area (1982) showed that the ratio of packing density to covering density of any convex body in the plane is at least 3/4. His 1990 paper on double lattices with his son Greg provides the best lower bound known at that time for packing densities of arbitrary two-dimensional convex bodies; with Bezdek (1990) he calculated the exact packing density of the infinite cylinder, which prior to Hales' 1998 solution of the Kepler conjecture was the first nontrivial calculation of the packing density of any three-dimensional convex body.

== Awards and honors ==
As a high school student, Kuperberg won first prize in the 10th Polish Mathematical Olympiad, leading him to enroll in mathematics when he began his college studies. While at the University of Warsaw he received both the university's Excellence in Teaching and Research Award and the Polish Mathematical Society Award for Young Mathematicians. He was honored again at Auburn by a five-year Alumni Professor chairship in 1996, and again by an Erdős Professorship in 1999, which he used to visit the Hungarian Academy of Sciences in Budapest. In 2003, his colleagues presented him with a festschrift.

== Selected publications ==
- Kuperberg, W. (1982), "Packing convex bodies in the plane with density greater than 3/4.", Geometriae Dedicata, 13 (2): 149–155, doi:10.1007/BF00147658, MR 0684150, S2CID 122067486.
- Bezdek, A.; Kuperberg, W. (1990), "Maximum density space packing with congruent circular cylinders of infinite length", Mathematika, 37 (1): 74–80, doi:10.1112/S0025579300012808, MR 1067888.
- Kuperberg, G.; Kuperberg, W. (1990), "Double-lattice packings of convex bodies in the plane", Discrete and Computational Geometry, 5 (4): 389–397, doi:10.1007/BF02187800, MR 1043721.
