= Unordered pair =

Unordered set containing two elements

In mathematics, an unordered pair or pair set is a set of the form {a, b}, i.e. a set having two elements a and b with no particular relation between them, where {a, b} = {b, a}. In contrast, an ordered pair (a, b) has a as its first element and b as its second element, which means (a, b) ≠ (b, a) unless a=b.

While the two elements of an ordered pair (a, b) need not be distinct, many authors require the elements of an unordered pair {a, b} to be distinct. However, unordered pairs whose two elements are not required to be distinct are also sometimes used, especially in the context of graph theory, where they can represent loops in undirected graphs.

In axiomatic set theory, the existence of unordered pairs is required by an axiom, the axiom of pairing.

More generally, an unordered n-tuple is a set of the form {a_{1}, a_{2}, ..., a_{n}}, a discrete n-point set.
