= Proof assistant =

Interactive theorem prover software

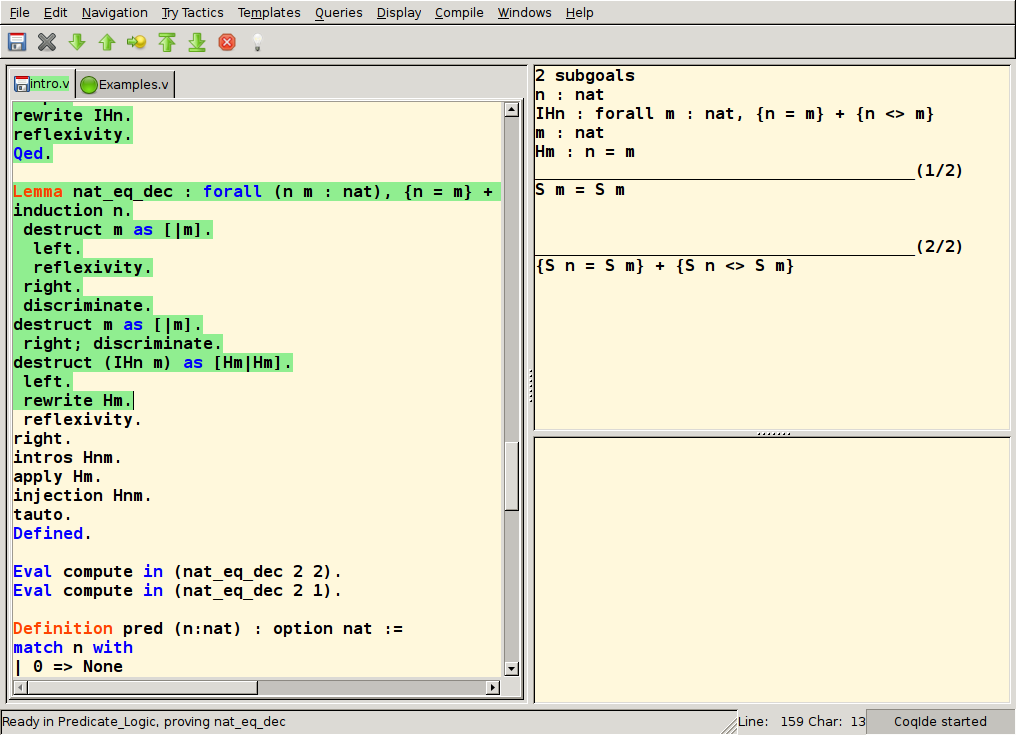
An interactive proof session in RocqIDE, showing the proof script on the left and the proof state on the right

In computer science and mathematical logic, a proof assistant or interactive theorem prover is a software tool to assist with the development of formal proofs by human–machine collaboration. This involves some sort of interactive proof editor, or other interface, with which a human can guide the search for proofs, the details of which are stored in, and some steps provided by, a computer.

A recent effort within this field is making these tools use artificial intelligence to automate the formalization of ordinary mathematics.

== Automated proof checking ==
Automated proof checking is the process of using software for checking proofs for correctness. It is one of the most developed fields in automated reasoning. Automated proof checking differs from automated theorem proving in that automated proof checking simply mechanically checks the formal workings of an existing proof, instead of trying to develop new proofs or theorems itself. Because of this, the task of automated proof verification is much simpler than that of automated theorem proving, allowing automated proof checking software to be much simpler than automated theorem proving software. Proofs which can be checked by small programs are described as meeting the de Bruijn criterion.

Because of this small size, some automated proof checking systems can have less than a thousand lines of core code, and are thus themselves amenable to both hand-checking and automated software verification. The Mizar system, HOL Light, and Metamath are examples of automated proof checking systems. Automated proof checking can be done either as a batch operation, or interactively, as part of an interactive theorem proving system.

== Soundness ==
Errors in proof checkers that allow false statements to be declared as proven true, known as soundness bugs, are the most serious kind of bug found in proof checkers. The presence of a soundness bug in a checker potentially invalidates every proof that has been checked with that system. This can be addressed by a number of means, including making the checkers as small as possible to minimize the attack surface, exposing the checkers' source code for public review, the use of multiple independently written proof checkers on the basis of the Swiss cheese principle, and the formal proving of proof checkers themselves. Soundness bugs have been found (and subsequently fixed) in systems such as Rust's type checker, and the kernel checkers in Lean, HOL Light and Rocq.

== History ==
Automath, which was developed by Nicolaas Govert de Bruijn starting in 1967, is often considered the first proof checker and the first system to utilize the Curry–Howard correspondence between programs and proofs. Automath was used by L. S. van Benthem Jutting in 1977 to formalize Edmund Landau's Foundations of Analysis, which was the first formalization of the real numbers.

In 1973, Robert Boyer and J Moore published Proving Theorems about LISP Functions which aimed to verify programs, not mathematics. Their theorem prover is now known as ACL2.

In the 1970s, Edinburgh LCF introduced the idea of using a functional programming language as the metalanguage for a theorem prover, and led to the HOL family of proof assistants.

The 1990s saw the rise of Rocq, (then known as Coq), which has been used for many large-scale formalization projects. Since the late 2010s, Lean, a proof assistant strongly influenced by Rocq, has become another popular choice, especially for formalizing mathematics.

== System comparison ==
Name	Latest version	Developer(s)	Implementation language	Features					
Name	Latest version	Developer(s)	Implementation language	Higher-order logic	Dependent types	Small kernel	Proof automation	Proof by reflection	Code generation
ACL2	8.3	Matt Kaufmann, J Strother Moore	Common Lisp	No	Untyped	No	Yes	Yes	Already executable
Agda	2.8.0	Ulf Norell, Nils Anders Danielsson, and Andreas Abel (Chalmers and Gothenburg)	Haskell	Yes	Yes	Yes	Yes	Partial	Already executable
Albatross	0.4	Helmut Brandl	OCaml	Yes	No	Yes	Yes	Unknown	Not yet implemented
F*	repository	Microsoft Research and INRIA	F*	Yes	Yes	No	Yes	Yes	Yes
HOL Light	repository	John Harrison	OCaml	Yes	No	Yes	Yes	No	No
HOL4	Kananaskis-13 (or repo)	Michael Norrish, Konrad Slind, and others	Standard ML	Yes	No	Yes	Yes	No	Yes
Idris	2 0.6.0	Edwin Brady	Idris	Yes	Yes	Yes	Unknown	Partial	Yes
Isabelle	Isabelle2025 (March 2025)	Larry Paulson (Cambridge), Tobias Nipkow (München) and Makarius Wenzel	Standard ML, Scala	Yes	No	Yes	Yes	Yes	Yes
Lean	4.35.0-rc2	Leonardo de Moura (AWS)	C++, Lean	Yes	Yes	Yes	Yes	Yes	Yes
LEGO	1.3.1	Randy Pollack (Edinburgh)	Standard ML	Yes	Yes	Yes	No	No	No
Metamath	0.198	Norman Megill	ANSI C						
Mizar	8.1.11	Białystok University	Free Pascal	Partial	Yes	No	No	No	No
Nqthm									
NuPRL	5	Cornell University	Common Lisp	Yes	Yes	Yes	Yes	Unknown	Yes
PVS	6.0	SRI International	Common Lisp	Yes	Yes	No	Yes	No	Unknown
Rocq	9.0	INRIA	OCaml	Yes	Yes	Yes	Yes	Yes	Yes
Twelf	1.7.1	Frank Pfenning, Carsten Schürmann	Standard ML	Yes	Yes	Unknown	No	No	Unknown

- ACL2 – a programming language, a first-order logical theory, and a theorem prover (with both interactive and automatic modes) in the Boyer–Moore tradition.
- HOL theorem provers – A family of tools ultimately derived from the LCF theorem prover. In these systems, the logical core is a library of their programming language. Theorems represent new elements of the language and can only be introduced via "strategies" which guarantee logical correctness. Strategy composition gives users the ability to produce significant proofs with relatively few interactions with the system. Members of the family include:
  - HOL4 – The "primary descendant", still under active development. Support for both Moscow ML and Poly/ML. Has a BSD-style license.
  - HOL Light – A thriving "minimalist fork". OCaml based.
  - ProofPower – Went proprietary, then returned to open source. Based on Standard ML.
- IMPS, An Interactive Mathematical Proof System.
- Isabelle is an interactive theorem prover where other systems can be encoded. Isabelle/HOL is its most popular instance, whose foundation is close to that of the HOL prover. Other instances include Isabelle/ZF and Isabelle/FOL. The main code-base is BSD-licensed, but the Isabelle distribution bundles many add-on tools with different licenses.
- Jape – Java based.
- Lean is both an interactive theorem prover and a functional, dependently-typed programming language. It is based on the calculus of inductive constructions with non-cumulative universes. Since version 4 (released in 2023), it is self-hosting. It can be used to formalize mathematics (and has a large, coherent library for formal mathematics), but also for software and hardware verification.
- LEGO
- Matita – A light system based on the calculus of inductive constructions.
- MINLOG – A proof assistant based on first-order minimal logic.
- Mizar – A proof assistant based on first-order logic, in a natural deduction style, and Tarski–Grothendieck set theory.
- PhoX – A proof assistant based on higher-order logic which is eXtensible.
- Prototype Verification System (PVS) – a proof language and system based on higher-order logic.
- Rocq (formerly named Coq) – A popular interactive theorem prover based on the calculus of inductive constructions.
- Theorem Proving System (TPS) and ETPS – Interactive theorem provers also based on simply typed lambda calculus, but based on an independent formulation of the logical theory and independent implementation.

== User interfaces ==
A commonly used front-end for proof assistants was the Emacs-based Proof General, developed at the University of Edinburgh. Nowadays, many provers include their own editor. Rocq includes RocqIDE, which is based on OCaml/Gtk. Isabelle includes Isabelle/jEdit, which is based on jEdit and the Isabelle/Scala infrastructure for document-oriented proof processing. More recently, Visual Studio Code extensions have been developed for Rocq, Isabelle by Makarius Wenzel, and for Lean 4 by the leanprover developers.

== Formalization extent ==
Freek Wiedijk has been keeping a ranking of proof assistants by the amount of formalized theorems out of a list of 100 well-known theorems. As of October 2026, only six systems have formalized proofs of more than 70% of the theorems, namely Lean, HOL Light, Isabelle, Rocq, Metamath and Mizar while only Lean has formalized proofs for all 100.

== Notable formalized proofs ==
The following is a list of notable proofs that have been formalized within proof assistants.

Theorem	Proof assistant	Year
Four color theorem	Rocq	2005
Feit–Thompson theorem	Rocq	2012
Fundamental group of the circle	Rocq	2013
Erdős–Graham problem	Lean	2022
Polynomial Freiman-Ruzsa conjecture over $\mathbb F_2$	Lean	2023
BB(5) = 47,176,870	Rocq	2024

== See also ==
- Automated theorem proving – Subfield of automated reasoning and mathematical logic
- Computer-assisted proof – Mathematical proof at least partially generated by computer
- Formal verification – Proving or disproving the correctness of certain intended algorithms
- Prover9 – is an automated theorem prover for first-order and equational logic
- QED manifesto – Proposal for a computer-based database of all mathematical knowledge
- Satisfiability modulo theories – Logical problem studied in computer science
- List of mathematical discoveries by artificial intelligence
