= Nominal techniques =

Nominal techniques in computer science are a range of techniques, based on nominal sets, for handling names and binding, e.g. in abstract syntax. Research into nominal sets gave rise to nominal terms, a metalanguage for embedding object languages with name binding constructs.

== See also ==
- De Bruijn index
- Higher order abstract syntax
