= Nominal terms =

Nominal terms may refer to:

- Nominal terms (computer science)
- Real versus nominal value (economics)
