= Logical framework =

Computer science and type theory concept

In logic, a logical framework provides a means to define (or present) a logic as a signature in a higher-order type theory in such a way that provability of a formula in the original logic reduces to a type inhabitation problem in the framework type theory. This approach has been used successfully for (interactive) automated theorem proving. The first logical framework was Automath; however, the name of the idea comes from the more widely known Edinburgh Logical Framework, LF. Several more recent proof tools like Isabelle are based on this idea. Unlike a direct embedding, the logical framework approach allows many logics to be embedded in the same type system.

== Overview ==
A logical framework is based on a general treatment of syntax, rules and proofs by means of a dependently typed lambda calculus. Syntax is treated in a style similar to, but more general than Per Martin-Löf's system of arities.

To describe a logical framework, one must provide the following:

1. A characterization of the class of object-logics to be represented;
2. An appropriate meta-language;
3. A characterization of the mechanism by which object-logics are represented.

This is summarized by:

"Framework = Language + Representation."

== LF ==
In the case of the LF logical framework, the meta-language is the λΠ-calculus. This is a system of first-order dependent function types which are related by the propositions as types principle to first-order minimal logic. The key features of the λΠ-calculus are that it consists of entities of three levels: objects, types and kinds (or type classes, or families of types). It is predicative, all well-typed terms are strongly normalizing and Church-Rosser and the property of being well-typed is decidable. However, type inference is undecidable.

A logic is represented in the LF logical framework by the judgements-as-types representation mechanism. This is inspired by Per Martin-Löf's development of Kant's notion of judgement, in the 1983 Siena Lectures. The two higher-order judgements, the hypothetical $J\vdash K$ and the general, $\Lambda x\in J. K(x)$, correspond to the ordinary and dependent function space, respectively. The methodology of judgements-as-types is that judgements are represented as the types of their proofs. A logical system ${\mathcal L}$ is represented by its signature which assigns kinds and types to a finite set of constants that represents its syntax, its judgements and its rule schemes. An object-logic's rules and proofs are seen as primitive proofs of hypothetico-general judgements $\Lambda x\in C. J(x)\vdash K$.

An implementation of the LF logical framework is provided by the Twelf system at Carnegie Mellon University. Twelf includes

- a logic programming engine
- meta-theoretic reasoning about logic programs (termination, coverage, etc.)
- an inductive meta-logical theorem prover

== See also ==
- Grammatical Framework
- Turnstile (symbol)
