= De Bruijn index =

Mathematical notation in lambda calculus

In mathematical logic, the de Bruijn index is a tool invented by the Dutch mathematician Nicolaas Govert de Bruijn for representing terms of lambda calculus without naming the bound variables. Terms written using these indices are invariant with respect to α-conversion, so the check for α-equivalence is the same as that for syntactic equality. Each de Bruijn index is a natural number that represents an occurrence of a variable in a λ-term, and denotes the number of binders that are in scope between that occurrence and its corresponding binder. The following are some examples:

- The term λx. λy. x, sometimes called the K combinator, is written as λ λ 2 with de Bruijn indices. The binder for the occurrence x is the second λ in scope.
- The term λx. λy. λz. x z (y z) (the S combinator), with de Bruijn indices, is λ λ λ 3 1 (2 1).
- The term λz. (λy. y (λx. x)) (λx. z x) is λ (λ 1 (λ 1)) (λ 2 1). See the following illustration, where the binders are colored and the references are shown with arrows.

De Bruijn indices are commonly used in higher-order reasoning systems such as automated theorem provers and logic programming systems.

== Formal definition ==
Formally, λ-terms (M, N, ...) written using de Bruijn indices have the following syntax (parentheses allowed freely):

M, N, ... ::= n | M N | λ M

where n—natural numbers greater than 0—are the variables. A variable n is bound if it is in the scope of at least n binders (λ); otherwise it is free. The binding site for a variable n is the nth binder it is in the scope of, starting from the innermost binder.

The most primitive operation on λ-terms is substitution: replacing free variables in a term with other terms. In the β-reduction (λ M) N, for example, we must

1. find the instances of the variables n_{1}, n_{2}, ..., n_{k} in M that are bound by the λ in λ M,
2. decrement the free variables of M to match the removal of the outer λ-binder, and
3. replace n_{1}, n_{2}, ..., n_{k} with N, suitably incrementing the free variables occurring in N each time, to match the number of λ-binders, under which the corresponding variable occurs when N substitutes for one of the n_{i}.

To illustrate, consider the application

(λ λ 4 2 (λ 1 3)) (λ 5 1)

which might correspond to the following term written in the usual notation

(λx. λy. z x (λu. u x)) (λx. w x).

After step 1, we obtain the term λ 4 □ (λ 1 □), where the occurrences of the variable that is being substituted are replaced with boxes. Step 2 decrements the free variables, giving λ 3 □ (λ 1 □). Finally, in step 3, we replace the boxes with the argument, namely λ 5 1; the first box is under one binder, so we replace it with λ 6 1 (which is λ 5 1 with the free variables increased by 1); the second is under two binders, so we replace it with λ 7 1. The final result is λ 3 (λ 6 1) (λ 1 (λ 7 1)).

Formally, a substitution is an unbounded list of terms, written M_{1}.M_{2}..., where M_{i} is the replacement for the ith free variable. The increasing operation in step 3 is sometimes called shift and written ↑^{k} where k is a natural number indicating the amount to increase the variables, and is defined by

$$\uparrow^k = (k + 1).(k + 2). ...$$

For example, ↑^{0} is the identity substitution, leaving a term unchanged. A finite list of terms M_{1}.M_{2}...M_{n} abbreviates the substitution M_{1}.M_{2}...M_{n}.(n+1).(n+2)... leaving all variables greater than n unchanged. The application of a substitution s to a term M is written M[s]. The composition of two substitutions s_{1} and s_{2} is written s_{1} s_{2} and is defined by

(M_{1}.M_{2}...) s = M_{1}[s].M_{2}[s]...

satisfying the property

M [s_{1} s_{2}] = (M [s_{1}]) [s_{2}],

and substitution is defined on terms as follows:

$$\begin{align}
n [N_1\ldots N_n\ldots] =& N_n \\
(M_1\;M_2) [s] =& (M_1[s]) (M_2[s]) \\
(\lambda\;M) [s] =& \lambda\;(M [1.s'])\\
& \text{where } s' = s \uparrow^1
\end{align}$$

The steps outlined for the β-reduction above are thus more concisely expressed as:

(λ M) N →_{β} M [N.1.2.3...].

== Alternatives to de Bruijn indices ==
When using the standard "named" representation of λ-terms, where variables are treated as labels or strings, one must explicitly handle α-conversion when defining any operation on the terms. In practice this is cumbersome, inefficient, and often error-prone. It has therefore led to the search for different representations of such terms. On the other hand, the named representation of λ-terms is more pervasive and can be more immediately understandable by others because the variables can be given descriptive names. Thus, even if a system uses de Bruijn indices internally, it will usually present a user interface with names.

An alternative way to view de Bruijn indices is as de Bruijn levels, which indexes variables from the bottom of the stack rather than from the top. This eliminates the need to reindex free variables, for example when weakening the context, whereas de Bruijn indices eliminate the need to reindex bound variables, for example when substituting a closed expression in another context.

De Bruijn indices are not the only representation of λ-terms that obviates the problem of α-conversion. Among named representations, the nominal techniques of Pitts and Gabbay is one approach, where the representation of a λ-term is treated as an equivalence class of all terms rewritable to it using variable permutations. This approach is taken by the Nominal Datatype Package of Isabelle/HOL.

Another common alternative is an appeal to higher-order representations where the λ-binder is treated as a true function. In such representations, the issues of α-equivalence, substitution, etc. are identified with the same operations in a meta-logic.

When reasoning about the meta-theoretic properties of a deductive system in a proof assistant, it is sometimes desirable to limit oneself to first-order representations and to have the ability to name or rename assumptions. The locally nameless approach uses a mixed representation of variables—de Bruijn indices for bound variables and names for free variables—that is able to benefit from the α-canonical form of de Bruijn indexed terms when appropriate.

=== Barendregt's variable convention ===
Barendregt's variable convention is a convention commonly used in proofs and definitions where it is assumed that:

- bound variables are distinct from free variables, and
- all binders bind variables not already in scope.

In the general context of an inductive definition, it is not possible to apply α-conversion as needed to convert an inductive definition using the convention to one where the convention is not used, because a variable may appear in both a binding position and a non-binding position in the rule. The induction principle holds if every rule satisfies the following two conditions:

- the rule is equivariant in the sense of nominal logic, that is to say that its validity is unchanged by renaming variables
- assuming the premises of the rule, the variables in binding positions in the rule are distinct and are free in the conclusion

== See also ==
- The de Bruijn notation for λ-terms.
- Combinatory logic, a more essential way to eliminate variable names.
