= ΛProlog =

Computer programming language

λProlog
- Paradigm: Logic programming
- Designed by: Dale Miller and Gopalan Nadathur
- First appeared: 1987
- Typing discipline: strongly typed
- License: GNU General Public License v3
- Website: www.lix.polytechnique.fr/Labo/Dale.Miller/lProlog/

Major implementations
- Teyjus, ELPI

Influenced by
- Prolog

Influenced
- Makam

λProlog, also written lambda Prolog, is a logic programming language featuring polymorphic typing, modular programming, and higher-order programming. These extensions to Prolog are derived from the higher-order hereditary Harrop formulas used to justify the foundations of λProlog. Higher-order quantification, simply typed λ-terms, and higher-order unification gives λProlog the basic supports needed to capture the λ-tree syntax approach to higher-order abstract syntax, an approach to representing syntax that maps object-level bindings to programming language bindings. Programmers in λProlog need not deal with bound variable names: instead various declarative devices are available to deal with binder scopes and their instantiations.

== History ==
Since 1986, λProlog has received numerous implementations. As of 2023, the language and its implementations are still actively being developed.

The Abella theorem prover has been designed to provide an interactive environment for proving theorems about the declarative core of λProlog.

== Programming in λProlog ==
Two unique features of λProlog include implications and universal quantification. Implication is used for local scoping of predicate definitions while universal quantification is used for local scoping of variables, as in the following implementation of reverse depending on an auxiliary rev predicate:

reverse L K :- pi rev \
  (rev nil K &
   (pi H\ pi T\ pi S\ rev (H::T) S :- rev T (H::S))) 
      => rev L nil.

?- reverse [1, 2, 3] L.

Success:
  L = 3 :: 2 :: 1 :: nil

A common use of these scoping constructs is to simulate scope often seen in an inference-rule presentation of a logic. For example, proof search (and proof checking) in natural deduction may be encoded as follows:

pv Pf P :- hyp Pf P.
pv (andI P1 P2) (and A B) :- pv P1 A, pv P2 B.
pv (impI P) (imp A B) :- pi p \ (hyp p A) => (pv (P p) B).
pv (andE1 P) A :- sigma B \ hyp P (and A B).
pv (andE2 P) B :- sigma A \ hyp P (and A B).
pv (impE P1 P2) B :- sigma A \ hyp P1 (imp A B), pv P2 A.

?- pi p q r \ pv (Pf p q r) (imp p (imp (and q r) (and (and p q) r))).

Success:
Pf = W1\ W2\ W3\ impI (W4\ impI (W5\ andI (andI W4 (andE1 W5)) (andE2 W5)))

== Implementations ==
- The Teyjus λProlog compiler is currently the oldest implementation still being maintained. This compiler project is led by Gopalan Nadathur and various of his colleagues and students.
- ELPI: an Embeddable λProlog Interpreter has been developed by Enrico Tassi and Claudio Sacerdoti Coen. It is implemented in OCaml and is available online. The system is described in a paper that appeared LPAR 2015. ELPI is also available as a Coq plugin: see Enrico Tassi's tutorial on this plugin.
- The Abella prover can be used to prove theorems about λProlog programs and specifications.

== See also ==
- Curry's paradox#Lambda calculus — about inconsistency problems caused by combining (propositional) logic and untyped lambda calculus
- Comparison of Prolog implementations
- Prolog syntax and semantics
