= Competitions and prizes in artificial intelligence =

Research awards

There are a number of competitions and prizes to promote research in artificial intelligence.

== General machine intelligence ==
The David E. Rumelhart Prize is an annual award for making a "significant contemporary contribution to the theoretical foundations of human cognition". The prize is $100,000.

The Human-Competitive Award is an annual challenge started in 2004 to reward results "competitive with the work of creative and inventive humans". The prize is $10,000. Entries are required to use evolutionary computing.

The Intel AI Global Impact Festival is an international annual competition held by Intel Corporation for school, and college students with prizes upwards of $15,000. It is about artificial intelligence technology. There are two age brackets in this competition, 13-18 Age Group, and 18 and Above Age Group.

The IJCAI Award for Research Excellence is a biannual award given at the International Joint Conference on Artificial Intelligence (IJCAI) to researchers in artificial intelligence as a recognition of excellence of their career.

The 2011 Federal Virtual World Challenge, advertised by The White House and sponsored by the U.S. Army Research Laboratory's Simulation and Training Technology Center, held a competition offering a total of US$52,000 in cash prize awards for general artificial intelligence applications, including "adaptive learning systems, intelligent conversational bots, adaptive behavior (objects or processes)" and more.

The Machine Intelligence Prize is awarded annually by the British Computer Society for progress towards machine intelligence.

The Kaggle – "the world's largest community of data scientists compete to solve most valuable problems".

== Conversational behaviour ==
The Loebner prize is an annual competition to determine the best Turing test competitors. The winner is the computer system that, in the judges' opinions, demonstrates the "most human" conversational behaviour, they have an additional prize for a system that in their opinion passes a Turing test. This second prize has not yet been awarded.

== Automatic control ==
=== Pilotless aircraft ===
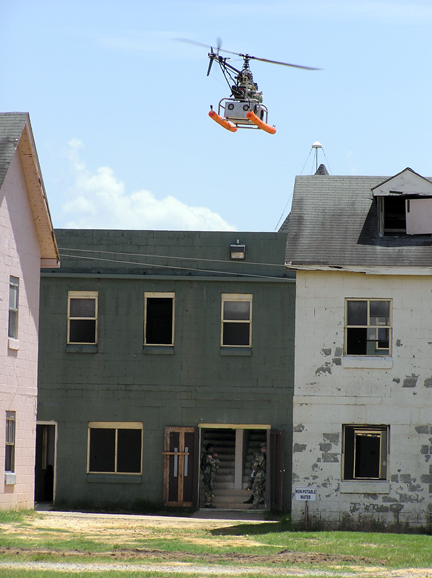
International Aerial Robotics Competition

The International Aerial Robotics Competition is a long-running event begun in 1991 to advance the state of the art in fully autonomous air vehicles. This competition is restricted to university teams (although industry and governmental sponsorship of teams is allowed). Key to this event is the creation of flying robots which must complete complex missions without any human intervention. Successful entries are able to interpret their environment and make real-time decisions based only on a high-level mission directive (e.g., "find a particular target inside a building having certain characteristics which is among a group of buildings 3 kilometers from the aerial robot launch point"). In 2000, a $30,000 prize was awarded during the 3rd Mission (search and rescue), and in 2008, $80,000 in prize money was awarded at the conclusion of the 4th Mission (urban reconnaissance).

=== Driverless cars ===
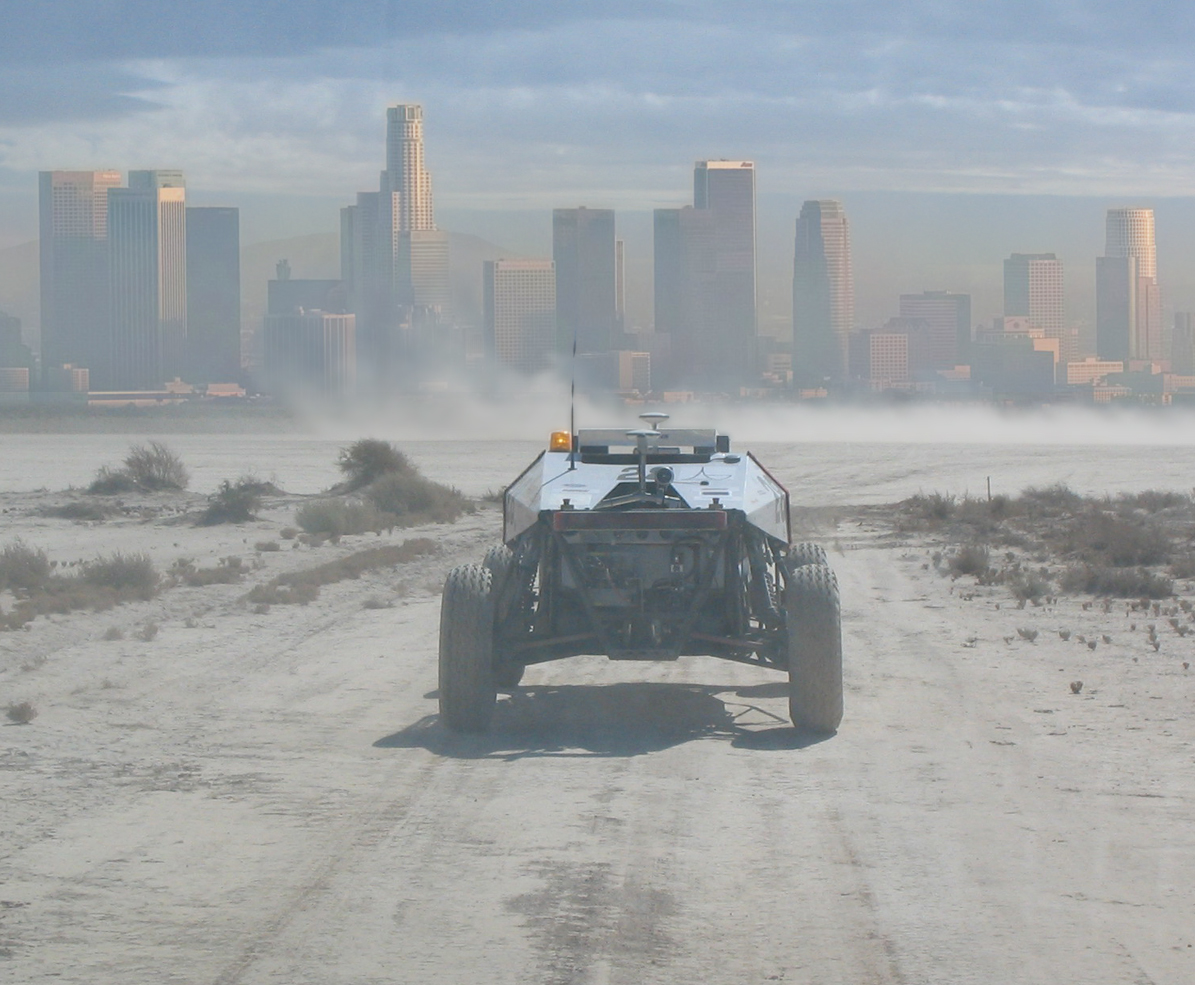
Darpa Grand Challenge

The DARPA Grand Challenge is a series of competitions to promote driverless car technology, aimed at a congressional mandate stating that by 2015 one-third of the operational ground combat vehicles of the US Armed Forces should be unmanned. While the first race had no winner, the second awarded a $2 million prize for the autonomous navigation of a hundred-mile trail, using GPS, computers and a sophisticated array of sensors. In November 2007, DARPA introduced the DARPA Urban Challenge, a sixty-mile urban area race requiring vehicles to navigate through traffic. In November 2010 the US Armed Forces extended the competition with the $1.6 million prize Multi Autonomous Ground-robotic International Challenge to consider cooperation between multiple vehicles in a simulated-combat situation.

Roborace will be a global motorsport championship with autonomously driving, electric vehicles. The series will be run as a support series during the Formula E championship for electric vehicles. This will be the first global championship for driverless cars.

== Data-mining and prediction ==
The Netflix Prize was a competition for the best collaborative filtering algorithm that predicts user ratings for films, based on previous ratings. The competition was held by Netflix, an online DVD-rental service. The prize was $1,000,000.

The Pittsburgh Brain Activity Interpretation Competition will reward analysis of fMRI data "to predict what individuals perceive and how they act and feel in a novel Virtual Reality world involving searching for and collecting objects, interpreting changing instructions, and avoiding a threatening dog." The prize in 2007 was $22,000.

The Face Recognition Grand Challenge (May 2004 to March 2006) aimed to promote and advance face recognition technology.

The American Meteorological Society's artificial intelligence competition involves learning a classifier to characterise precipitation based on meteorological analyses of environmental conditions and polarimetric radar data.

== Cooperation and coordination ==
=== Robot football ===
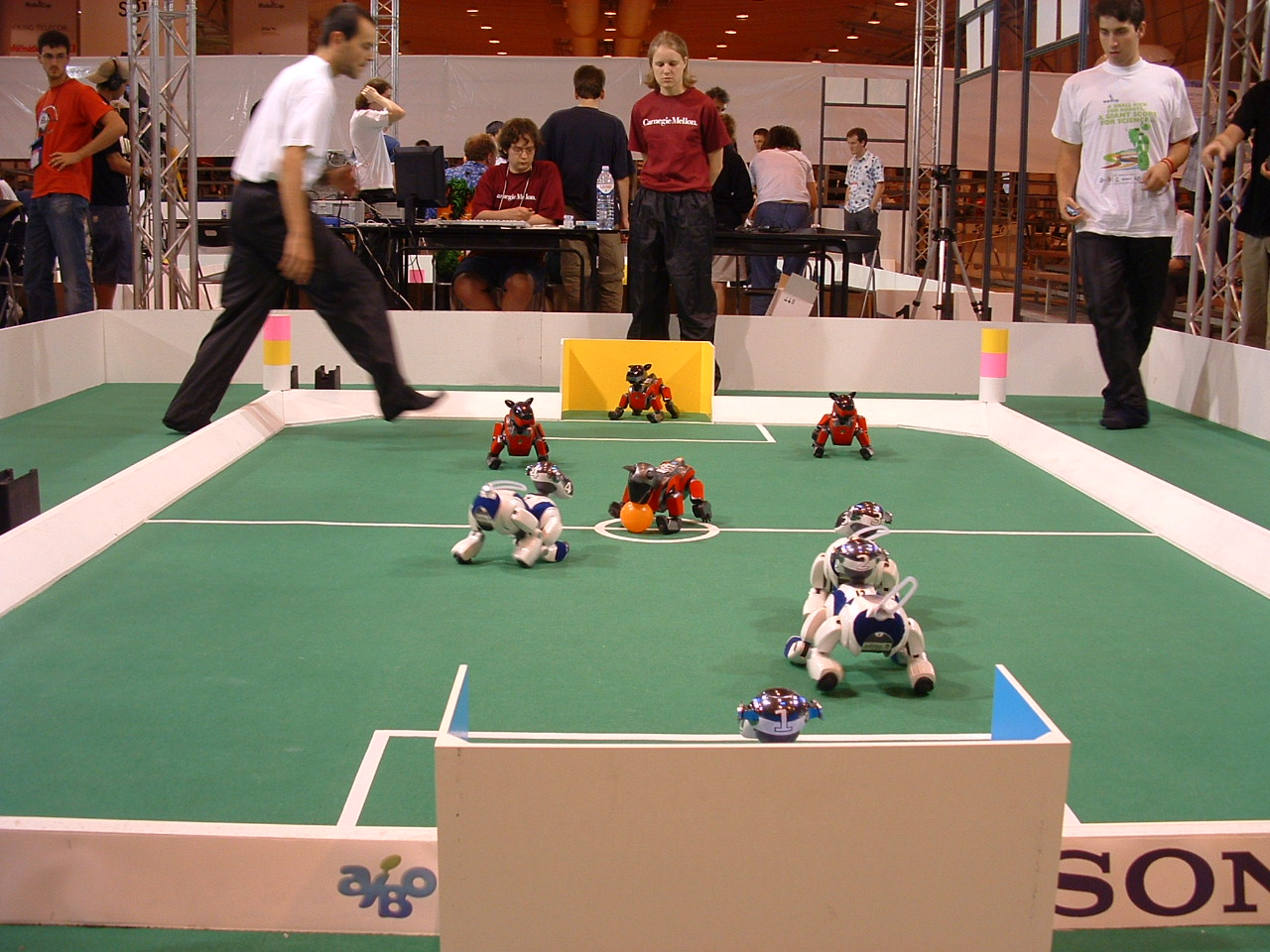
A legged league game from RoboCup 2004 in Lisbon, Portugal

The RoboCup and Federation of International Robot-soccer Association (FIRA) are annual international robot soccer competitions. The International RoboCup Federation challenge is by 2050 "a team of fully autonomous humanoid robot soccer players shall win the soccer game, comply with the official rule of the FIFA, against the winner of the most recent World Cup."

== Logic, reasoning and knowledge representation ==
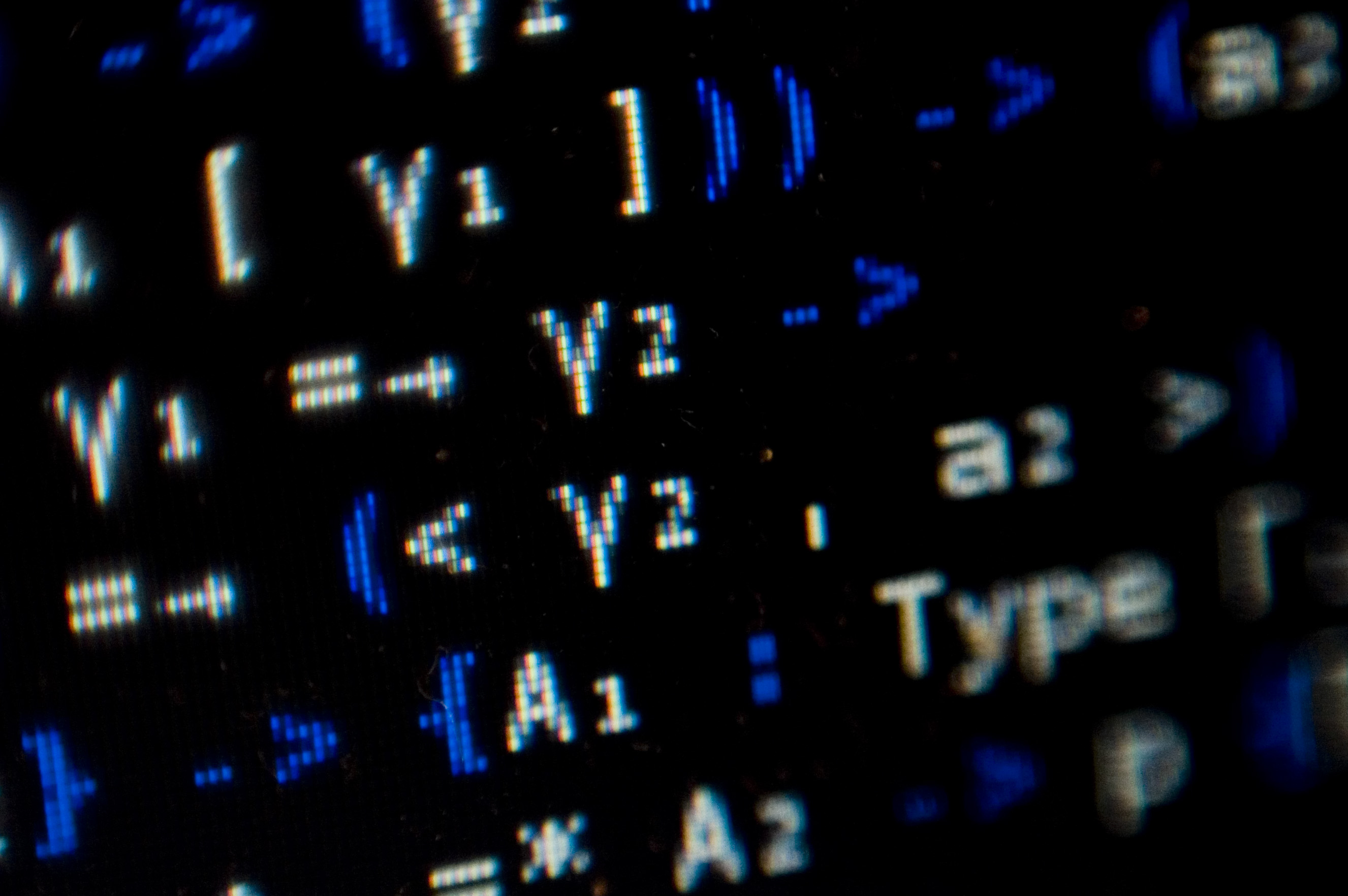
Excerpt of a proof in Agda2

The Herbrand Award is a prize given by Conference on Automated Deduction (CADE) Inc. to honour persons or groups for important contributions to the field of automated deduction. The prize is $1000.

The CADE ATP System Competition (CASC) is a yearly competition of fully automated theorem provers for classical first order logic associated with the Conference on Automated Deduction (CADE) and International Joint Conference on Automated Reasoning (IJCAR). The competition was part of the Alan Turing Centenary Conference in 2012, with total prizes of 9000 GBP given by Google.

The SUMO prize is an annual prize for the best open source ontology extension of the Suggested Upper Merged Ontology (SUMO), a formal theory of terms and logical definitions describing the world. The prize is $3000.

The Hutter Prize for lossless compression of human knowledge is a cash prize which rewards compression improvements on a specific 100 MB English text file. The prize awards 500 euros for each one percent improvement, up to €50,000. The organizers believe that text compression and AI are equivalent problems and 3 prizes have been given, at around € 2k.

The Cyc TPTP Challenge is a competition to develop reasoning methods for the Cyc comprehensive ontology and database of everyday common sense knowledge. The prize is 100 euros for "each winner of two related challenges".

The Eternity II challenge was a constraint satisfaction problem very similar to the Tetravex game. The objective is to lay 256 tiles on a 16x16 grid while satisfying a number of constraints. The problem is known to be NP-complete. The prize was US$2,000,000. The competition ended in December 2010.

== Games ==
The World Computer Chess Championship has been held since 1970. The International Computer Games Association continues to hold an annual Computer Olympiad which includes this event plus computer competitions for many other games.

The Ing Prize was a substantial money prize attached to the World Computer Go Congress, starting from 1985 and expiring in 2000. It was a graduated set of handicap challenges against young professional players with increasing prizes as the handicap was lowered. At the time it expired in 2000, the unclaimed prize was 400,000 NT dollars for winning a 9-stone handicap match.

The AAAI General Game Playing Competition is a competition to develop programs that are effective at general game playing. Given a definition of a game, the program must play it effectively without human intervention. Since the game is not known in advance the competitors cannot especially adapt their programs to a particular scenario. The prize in 2006 and 2007 was $10,000.

The General Video Game AI Competition (GVGAI) poses the problem of creating artificial intelligence that can play a wide, and in principle unlimited, range of games. Concretely, it tackles the problem of devising an algorithm that is able to play any game it is given, even if the game is not known a priori. Additionally, the contests poses the challenge of creating level and rule generators for any game is given. This area of study can be seen as an approximation of General Artificial Intelligence, with very little room for game dependent heuristics. The competition runs yearly in different tracks: single player planning, two-player planning, single player learning, level and rule generation, and each track prizes ranging from 200 to 500 US dollars for winners and runner-ups.

The 2007 Ultimate Computer Chess Challenge was a competition organised by World Chess Federation that pitted Deep Fritz against Deep Junior. The prize was $100,000.

The annual Arimaa Challenge offered a $10,000 prize until the year 2020 to develop a program that plays the board game Arimaa and defeats a group of selected human opponents. In 2015, David Wu's bot bot_sharp beat the humans, losing only 2 games out of 9. As a result, the Arimaa Challenge was declared over and David Wu received the prize of $12,000 ($2,000 being offered by third-parties for 2015's championship).

2K Australia is offering a prize worth A$10,000 to develop a game-playing bot that plays a first-person shooter video game which can convince a panel of judges that it is a human player. The competition started in 2008 and was won in 2012. A new competition is planned for 2014.

The Google AI Challenge was a bi-annual online contest organized by the University of Waterloo Computer Science Club and sponsored by Google that ran from 2009 to 2011. Each year a game was chosen and contestants submitted specialized automated bots to play against other competing bots.

Cloudball had its first round in Spring 2012 and finished on June 15. It is an international artificial intelligence programming contest, where users continuously submit the actions their soccer teams will take in each time step, in simple high level C# code.

The International Olympiad in Artificial Intelligence for high-school students was established in 2024 and consists of two rounds: in the scientific round, participants solve problems in different subfields of AI, and in the practical round, participants use existing AI tools to produce a visual result.

== See also ==
- Artificial intelligence
- Progress in artificial intelligence
- Glossary of artificial intelligence
