= Ulrike Sattler =

Computer scientist

Ulrike Sattler MAE
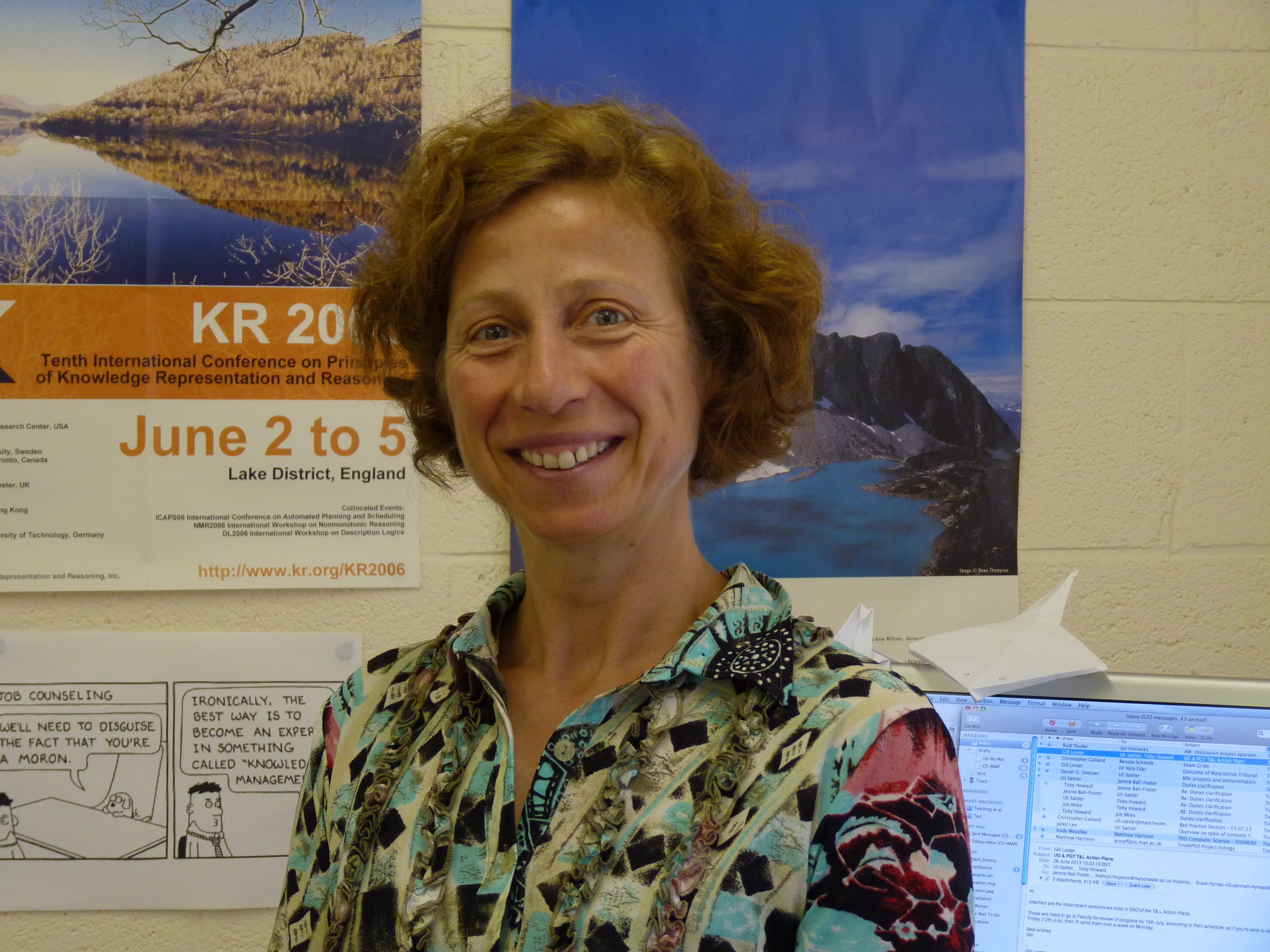
- Known for: Web Ontology Language (OWL)
- Awards: Member of the Academia Europaea (2014); SWSA Ten Year Award (2018)
- Scientific career
- Fields: Description Logics; Ontology Engineering; Automated Reasoning
- Institutions: University of Manchester; University of Oslo; Dresden University of Technology; Rice University; RWTH Aachen University
- Thesis: Terminological Knowledge Representation Systems in a Chemical Engineering Application (1998)
- Doctoral advisor: Franz Baader
- Website: www.cs.man.ac.uk/~sattler; www.manchester.ac.uk/research/uli.sattler

Ulrike M. Sattler MAE is a professor of computer science in the information management group of the Department of Computer Science at the University of Manchester and a visiting professor at the University of Oslo.

== Education ==
Sattler completed her PhD in 1998 under the supervision of Franz Baader at RWTH Aachen University in Germany.

== Career and research ==
Sattler moved to the University of Manchester as senior lecturer in 2003, was promoted to reader in 2006 and then to professor in 2007. Sattler's research focuses on logic to support knowledge representation including description logic, Dynamic logic and Modal logic. She is also investigating the inference problems, complexity theory and decision procedures associated with knowledge representation. This research has been important in the development of the Web Ontology Language (OWL) and its use in bioinformatics and molecular biology.

Sattler's research has been funded by the Engineering and Physical Sciences Research Council (EPSRC). She is the co-author of the textbook An Introduction to Description Logic with Ian Horrocks, Franz Baader and Carsten Lutz.

=== Academic service ===
Sattler serves as Editor-in-Chief of the Transactions on Graph Data and Knowledge, as editor of the Journal of Logic and Computation, and on the editorial board of the Journal of Automated Reasoning. Moreover, she has been the chair for various conferences including the International Joint Conference on Automated Reasoning (IJCAR).

=== Awards and honours ===
Sattler was elected a member of the Academia Europaea (MAE) in 2014. She was co-recipient with Bijan Parsia and Matthew Horridge of the best paper prize at the International Semantic Web Conference (ISWC) in 2008 which subsequently won the SWSA Ten Year award in 2018 for the highest impact paper from the ISWC proceedings ten years prior.
