= Tobias Nipkow =

German computer scientist (born 1958)

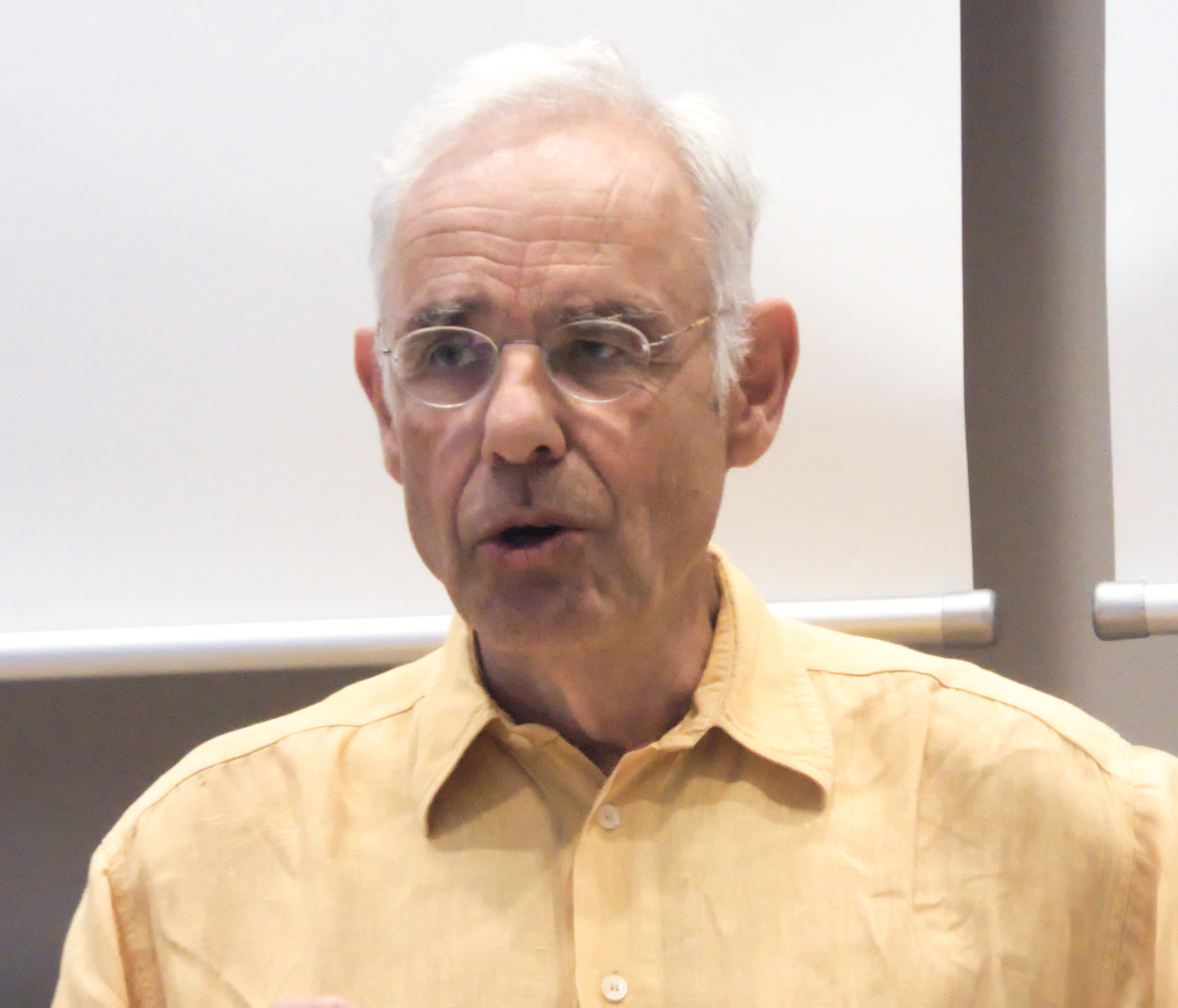
- Born: 1958 (age 67–68)
- Known for: Isabelle proof assistant
- Scientific career
- Institutions: MIT, Cambridge University, Technical University of Munich
- Thesis: Behavioural Implementation Concepts for Nondeterministic Data Types (1987)
- Doctoral advisor: Cliff B. Jones
- Website: www21.in.tum.de/~nipkow

Tobias Nipkow (born 1958) is a German computer scientist.

== Career ==
Nipkow received his Diplom (MSc) in computer science from the Department of Computer Science of the Technische Hochschule Darmstadt in 1982, and his Ph.D. from the University of Manchester in 1987.

He worked at MIT from 1987, changed to Cambridge University in 1989, and to the Technical University of Munich in 1992, where he was appointed professor for programming theory.

He is chair of the Logic and Verification group since 2011.

He is known for his work in interactive and automatic theorem proving, in particular for the Isabelle proof assistant; he was the editor of the Journal of Automated Reasoning up to January 1, 2021. Moreover, he focuses on programming language semantics, type systems and functional programming.

In 2021, he won the Herbrand Award "in recognition of his leadership in developing Isabelle and related tools, resulting in key contributions to the foundations, automation, and use of proof assistants in a wide range of applications, as well as his successful efforts in increasing the visibility of automated reasoning".

In 2022, he was elected a member of the Academia Europaea.

== Selected publications ==
- Martin, U. & Nipkow, T. (1986). "Unification in Boolean Rings". In Jörg H. Siekmann (ed.). Proc. 8th Conference on Automated Deduction. LNCS. Vol. 230. Springer. pp. 506–513.
- Tobias Nipkow (1987). Behavioural Implementation Concepts for Nondeterministic Data Types (Ph.D. thesis). Computer Science Dept. Report. Vol. UMCS-87-5-3. University of Manchester.
- Nipkow, T. (1989). "Combining Matching Algorithms: The Rectangular Case". In Nachum Dershowitz (ed.). Rewriting Techniques and Applications, 3rd Int. Conf., RTA-89. LNCS. Vol. 355. Springer. pp. 343–358.
- Tobias Nipkow (1990). "Unification in Primal Algebras, their Powers and their Varieties". Journal of the ACM. 37 (4): 742–776. doi:10.1145/96559.96569. S2CID 14940917.
- Nipkow, T. & Qian, Z. (1991). "Modular Higher-Order E-Unification". In Book, Ronald V. (ed.). Rewriting Techniques and Applications, 4th Int. Conf., RTA-91. LNCS. Vol. 488. Springer. pp. 200–214.
- Tobias Nipkow (1991). "Higher-Order Critical Pairs". Proc. 6th IEEE Symposium on Logic in Computer Science. pp. 342–349.
- Nipkow, T. (1995). "Higher-Order Rewrite Systems (invited lecture)". In Hsiang, Jieh (ed.). 6th Int. Conf. on Rewriting Techniques and Applications (RTA). LNCS. Vol. 914. Springer. p. 256.
- Franz Baader and Tobias Nipkow (1998). Term Rewriting and All That. Cambridge: Cambridge University Press. ISBN 978-0-521-45520-6.
- Nipkow, Tobias, ed. (1998). Rewriting Techniques and Applications, 9th Int. Conf., RTA-98. LNCS. Vol. 1379. Springer.
- Nipkow T. and Paulson L. and Wenzel M. (2002). Isabelle/HOL — A Proof Assistant for Higher-Order Logic. Springer.
- Gerwin Klein & Tobias Nipkow (2006). "A Machine-Checked Model for a Java-Like Language, Virtual Machine and Compiler". ACM Transactions on Programming Languages and Systems. 28 (4): 619–695. doi:10.1145/1146809.1146811.
