= Leonardo de Moura =

Computer scientist

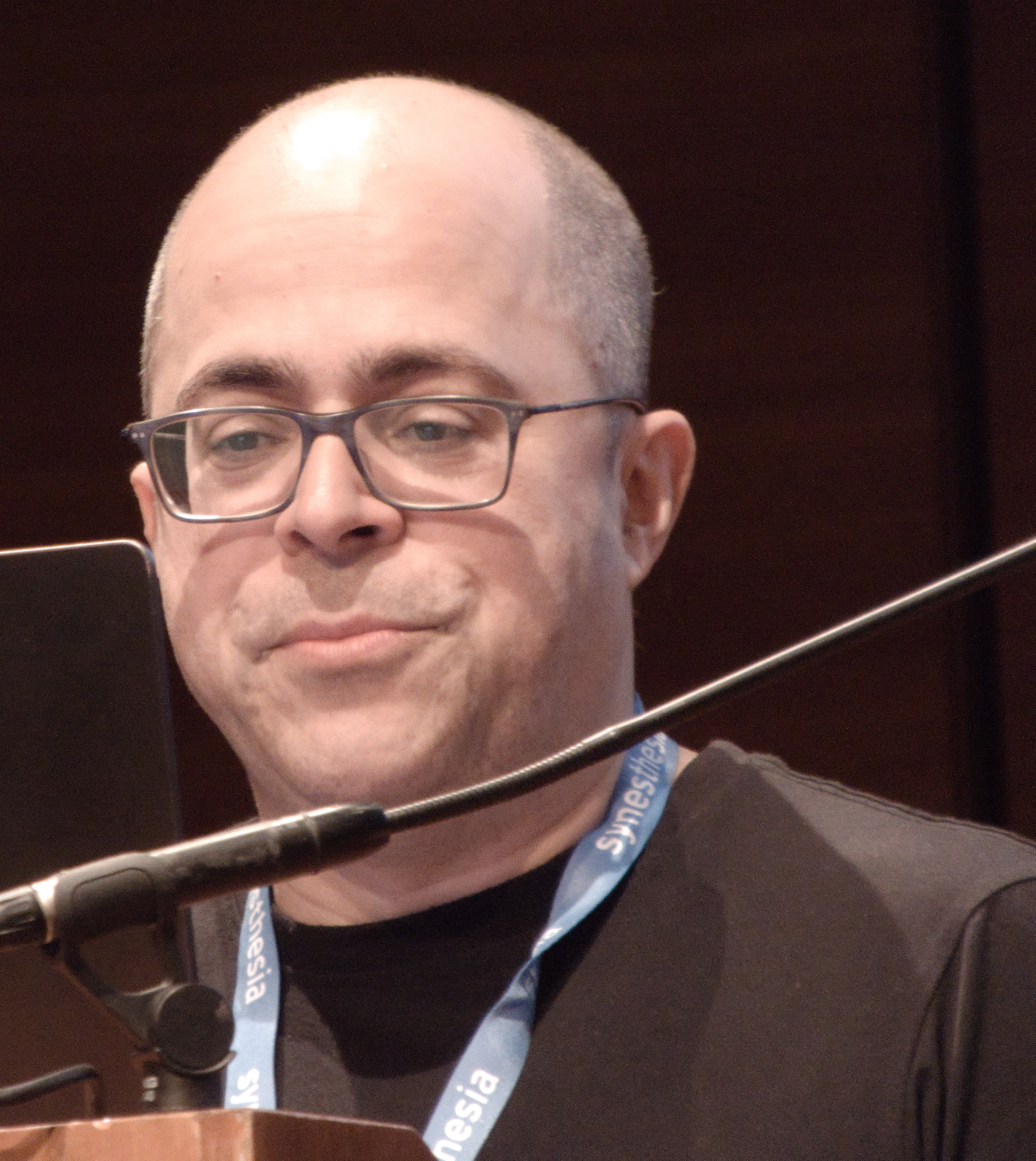
- Education: PUC-Rio (PhD)
- Known for: Lean proof assistant Z3 Theorem Prover
- Scientific career
- Fields: Computer science (mainly automated reasoning, automated theorem proving and decision procedures)
- Workplaces: AWS, Microsoft Research
- Website: https://leodemoura.github.io/

Leonardo de Moura is a Brazilian computer scientist, creator of the Lean proof assistant and co-creator of the Z3 Theorem Prover during his time at Microsoft Research. He currently works at AWS and is the Chief Architect at the Lean Focused Research Organization. De Moura obtained his Ph.D. in computer science at the Pontifical Catholic University of Rio de Janeiro in 2000.

== Awards and honors ==
- 2007 CADE Skolem Award for the paper "Efficient E-Matching for SMT Solvers".
- 2019 Herbrand Award (shared with Nikolaj Bjørner)
- 2021 Computer Aided Verification Award for his contributions regarding his work on Z3.
- 2025 CADE Skolem Award for the paper "The Lean Theorem Prover (System Description)".
- 2025 ACM SIGPLAN Programming Languages Software Award for his work on Lean.
