= Herbrand Award =

Award for research contributions to automated deduction

The Herbrand Award for Distinguished Contributions to Automated Reasoning is an award given by the Conference on Automated Deduction (CADE), Inc., (although it predates the formal incorporation of CADE) to honour persons or groups for important contributions to the field of automated deduction. The award is named after the French scientist Jacques Herbrand and given at most once per CADE or International Joint Conference on Automated Reasoning (IJCAR). It comes with a prize of US$1,000. Anyone can be nominated, the award is awarded after a vote among CADE trustees and former recipients, usually with input from the CADE/IJCAR programme committee.

== Recipients ==
Past award recipients are:

=== 1990s ===
- Larry Wos (1992)
- Woody Bledsoe (1994)
- John Alan Robinson (1996)
- Wu Wenjun (1997)
- Gérard Huet (1998)
- Robert S. Boyer and J Strother Moore (1999)

=== 2000s ===
- William W. McCune (2000)
- Donald W. Loveland (2001)
- Mark E. Stickel (2002).
- Peter B. Andrews (2003)
- Harald Ganzinger (2004)
- Martin Davis (2005)
- Wolfgang Bibel (2006)
- Alan Bundy (2007)
- Edmund M. Clarke (2008)
- Deepak Kapur (2009)

=== 2010s ===
- David Plaisted (2010)
- Nachum Dershowitz (2011)
- Melvin Fitting (2012)
- C. Greg Nelson (2013)
- Robert L. Constable (2014)
- Andrei Voronkov (2015)
- Zohar Manna and Richard Waldinger (2016)
- Lawrence C. Paulson (2017)
- Bruno Buchberger (2018)
- Nikolaj Bjørner and Leonardo de Moura (2019)

=== 2020s ===
- Franz Baader (2020)
- Tobias Nipkow (2021)
- Natarajan Shankar (2022)
- Moshe Vardi (2023)
- Armin Biere (2024)
- Aart Middeldorp (2025)

== See also ==
- List of computer science awards
- Jacques Herbrand Prize — by the French Academy of Sciences, for mathematics and physics
