= Frank van Harmelen =

Dutch computer scientist and professor (born 1960)

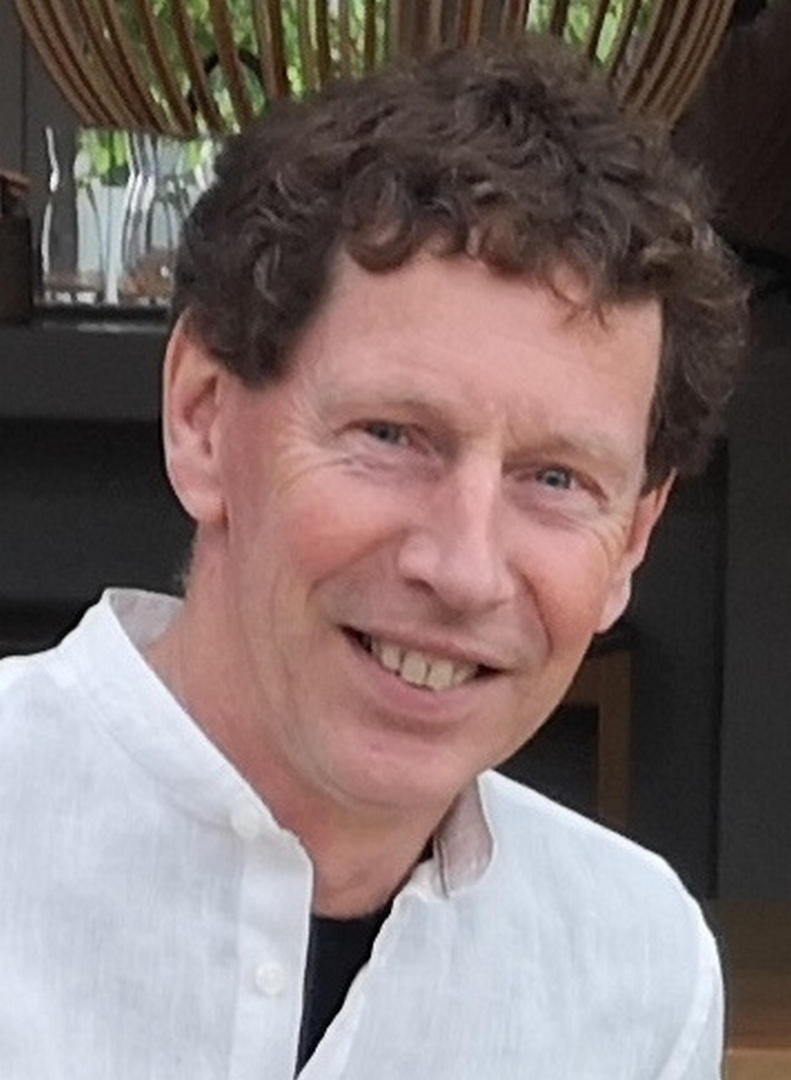
- Born: 1960 (age 65–66)
- Education: University of Edinburgh
- Scientific career
- Fields: Semantic Web
- Workplaces: Vrije Universiteit, Amsterdam
- Thesis: On the Efficiency of Meta-level Reasoning (1989)
- Academic advisors: Alan Bundy
- Website: www.cs.vu.nl/~frankh twitter.com/FrankVanHarmele

Frank van Harmelen (born 1960) is a Dutch computer scientist and professor in Knowledge Representation & Reasoning in the AI department at the Vrije Universiteit Amsterdam. He was scientific director of the LarKC project (2008–2011), "aiming to develop the Large Knowledge Collider, a platform for very large scale semantic web reasoning."

== Biography ==
After studying mathematics and computer science in Amsterdam, Van Harmelen moved to the Department of AI of the University of Edinburgh, where he was awarded a PhD in 1989 for his research on meta-level reasoning. While in Edinburgh, he "co-developed a logic-based toolkit for expert systems, and worked with Alan Bundy on proof planning for inductive theorem proving".

After his PhD research, he moved back to Amsterdam where he worked from 1990 to 1995 in the SWI Department under Professor Bob Wielinga, on the use of reflection in expert systems, on the formal underpinnings of the CommonKADS methodology for Knowledge-Based Systems. In 1995 he joined the AI research group at the Vrije Universiteit Amsterdam, where he co-lead the On-To-Knowledge project, one of the first Semantic Web projects. He was appointed full professor in 2002, and is leading the Knowledge Representation and Reasoning Group. Currently he is scientific director the LarKC project aiming to develop the Large Knowledge Collider, a platform for very large scale semantic web reasoning.

Van Harmelen was elected a member of the Royal Netherlands Academy of Arts and Sciences in 2017.

In 2019, Van Harmelen received a Zwaartekracht grant from the Dutch Ministry of Education, Culture and Science for The Hybrid Intelligence Center
