= Wayne Snyder =

American computer scientist

- Children: John Henry, Matthew
- Scientific career
- Thesis: Complete Sets of Transformations for General Unification (1988)
- Doctoral advisor: Jean Henri Gallier
- Website: www.cs.bu.edu/~snyder/

Wayne Snyder is an associate professor at Boston University known for his work in E-unification theory.

He was raised in Yardley, Pennsylvania, worked in his father's aircraft shop, attended the Berklee School of Music, and obtained an MA in Augustan poetry at Tufts University. He then studied computer science, and earned his Ph.D. at the University of Pennsylvania in 1988. In 1987 he came to Boston University, teaching introductory computer science, and researching on automated reasoning, and, more particularly, E-unification.

== Selected publications ==
- Gallier, Jean H.; Snyder, Wayne (1987). "A general complete E-unification procedure". Rewriting Techniques and Applications. Lecture Notes in Computer Science. Vol. 256. Springer. pp. 216–227. doi:10.1007/3-540-17220-3_19. ISBN 978-3-540-17220-8.
- Gallier, Jean H.; Snyder, Wayne (1989). "Complete sets of transformations for general E-unification". Theoretical Computer Science. 67 (2–3): 203–260. doi:10.1016/0304-3975(89)90004-2. Archived from the original on July 29, 2010.
- Snyder, Wayne (1989). "Efficient ground completion". Rewriting Techniques and Applications. Lecture Notes in Computer Science. Vol. 355. Springer. pp. 419–433. doi:10.1007/3-540-51081-8_123. ISBN 978-3-540-51081-9.
- Snyder, Wayne (1990). "Higher order E-unification". 10th International Conference on Automated Deduction. Lecture Notes in Computer Science. Vol. 449. Springer. pp. 573–587. doi:10.1007/3-540-52885-7_115. ISBN 978-3-540-52885-2.
- Gallier, Jean; Narendran, Paliath; Plaisted, David; Snyder, Wayne (1990). "Rigid E-unification: NP-completeness and applications to equational matings". Information and Computation. 87 (1–2): 129–195. doi:10.1016/0890-5401(90)90061-l. Archived from the original on July 29, 2010.
- Snyder, Wayne; Lynch, Christopher (1991). "Goal directed strategies for paramodulation". Rewriting Techniques and Applications. Lecture Notes in Computer Science. Vol. 488. Springer. pp. 150–161. doi:10.1007/3-540-53904-2_93. ISBN 978-3-540-53904-9.
- Lynch, Christopher; Snyder, Wayne (1993). "Redundancy criteria for constrained completion". Rewriting Techniques and Applications. Lecture Notes in Computer Science. Vol. 690. Springer. pp. 2–16. doi:10.1007/978-3-662-21551-7_2. ISBN 978-3-540-56868-1.
- Gallier, Jean; Narendran, Paliath; Plaisted, David; Raatz, Stan; Snyder, Wayne (1993). "An algorithm for finding canonical sets of ground rewrite rules in polynomial time" (PDF). Journal of the ACM. 40: 1–16. doi:10.1145/138027.138032.
- Baader, Franz; Snyder, Wayne; Narendran, Paliath; Schmidt-Schauss, Manfred; Schulz, Klaus (2001). "Unification Theory" (PDF). Handbook of Automated Reasoning. Vol. 1. Elsevier. pp. 445–533. doi:10.1016/B978-044450813-3/50010-2. ISBN 978-0-444-50813-3. Archived from the original (PDF) on 2015-06-08.
