= Snapask =

Online learning website

- Website type: Online learning
- Available in: English, Chinese
- Country of origin: Hong Kong
- Website: snapask.com
- Commercial: Yes
- Registration: Required
- Launched: 2015
- Current status: Inactive

Snapask was a Hong Kong–based online learning website that offers tutoring services to the students based in Hong Kong, Singapore, Thailand, Korea, Indonesia, Japan, Malaysia and Taiwan. The courses offered had no further update since 2022.

== History ==
Snapask was founded by Timothy Yu in January 2015. With its initial headquarters in Hong Kong, the service expanded to Taiwan and Singapore in 2015.

In January 2016, Snapask launched a new version Snapask 3.0, promising better optimization with respect to the student-tutor matching mechanism to induce faster responses. According to Yu, this version included machine-learning algorithm to understand students' study pattern.

In 2016, Snapask was awarded as the best team at the France Singapore ICT Awards 2016. In March 2016, Snapask became one of the companies to use Watson, a question answering (QA) computing system built by IBM, which involves advanced natural language processing, automated reasoning, information retrieval and knowledge representation.

In 2017 January, Snapask launched Snapask 4.0, which included concept-based quizzes, as an advanced feature.

As of June 2017, Snapask has a userbase of more than 300,000.

Snapask was one among the top 20 finalists at the 2017 EdTechXGlobal All Star Growth Awards.

== Technology ==
Snapask works as a mobile crowdsourcing platform that involves artificial intelligence and allows students to connect to tutors and receive instant one-on-one academic support. This app is said to address the questions and problems asked by its users within 15 seconds. Students are asked to take a picture of their queries and submit it to the platform; these questions are then, addressed by the tutors at Snapask.
