= John Alan Robinson =

American computer scientist

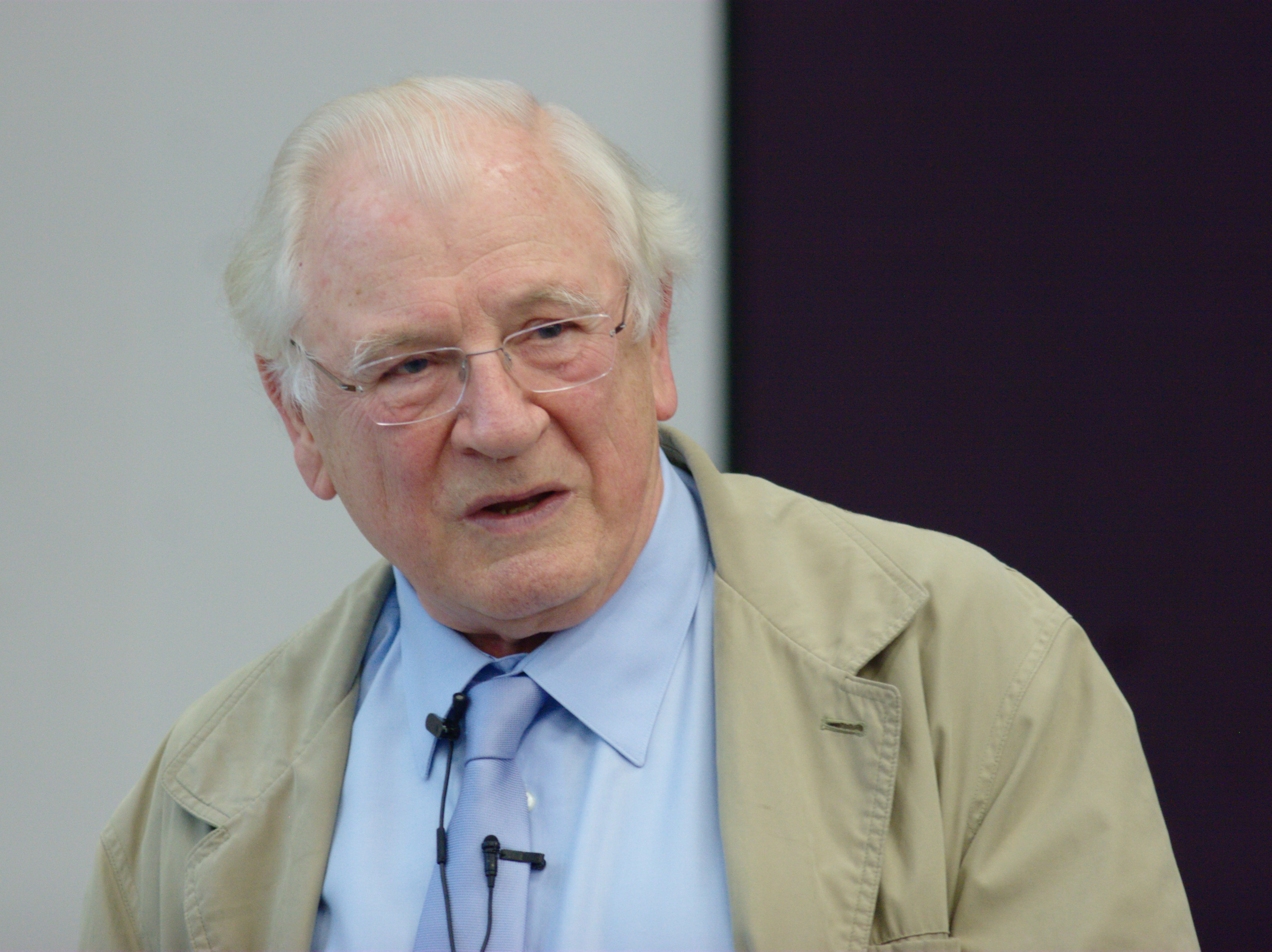
- Robinson in 2012
- Born: 9 March 1930; Halifax, West Yorkshire, UK
- Died: 5 August 2016 (aged 86); Portland, Maine, US
- Education: Cambridge University; University of Oregon; Princeton University
- Known for: resolution principle, unification
- Awards: AMS Milestone Award 1985, Humboldt Senior Scientist Award 1995, Herbrand Award 1996
- Scientific career
- Workplaces: Syracuse University
- Thesis: Causation, probability and testimony (1957)
- Doctoral advisor: Carl Hempel

John Alan Robinson (9 March 1930 – 5 August 2016) was a philosopher, mathematician, and computer scientist. He was a professor emeritus at Syracuse University.

Alan Robinson's major contribution is to the foundations of automated theorem proving. His unification algorithm eliminated one source of combinatorial explosion in resolution provers; it also prepared the ground for the logic programming paradigm, in particular for the Prolog language. Robinson received the 1996 Herbrand Award for Distinguished Contributions to Automated Reasoning.

== Life ==
Robinson was born in Halifax, Yorkshire, England in 1930 and left for the United States in 1952 after studying for a classics degree at Corpus Christi College, Cambridge. He studied philosophy at the University of Oregon before moving to Princeton University where he received his PhD in philosophy in 1956. He then worked at DuPont as an operations research analyst, where he learned computer programming and taught himself mathematics. He moved to Rice University in 1961, spending his summers as a visiting researcher at the Argonne National Laboratory's Applied Mathematics Division. He moved to Syracuse University as Distinguished Professor of Logic and Computer Science in 1967 and became professor emeritus in 1993.

It was at Argonne that Robinson became interested in automated theorem proving and developed unification and the resolution principle. Resolution and unification have since been incorporated in many automated theorem-proving systems and are the basis for the inference mechanisms used in logic programming and the programming language Prolog.

Robinson was the founding editor of the Journal of Logic Programming, and has received numerous honours. These include a Guggenheim Fellowship in 1967, the American Mathematical Society Milestone Award in Automatic Theorem Proving 1985, an AAAI Fellowship 1990, the Herbrand Award for Distinguished Contributions to Automatic Reasoning 1996, and the Association for Logic Programming honorary title Founder of Logic Programming in 1997. He has received honorary Doctorates from Katholieke Universiteit Leuven 1988, Uppsala University 1994, and Universidad Politecnica de Madrid 2003. Robinson died in Portland, Maine on 5 August 2016 from a ruptured aneurysm following surgery for pancreatic cancer.

In 1994, he received the Humboldt Senior Scientist Award at the request of Wolfgang Bibel, which included a six-month stay at the Department of Computer Science of the Technische Universität Darmstadt.

== Selected publications ==
- Robinson, J. Alan; Voronkov, Andrei, eds. (2001). Handbook of Automated Reasoning. MIT Press. ISBN 0-444-50813-9.
- Gabbay, Dov M.; Hogger, Christopher John; Robinson, J.A., eds. (1993-1998). Handbook of Logic in Artificial Intelligence and Logic Programming. Vols. 1-5, Oxford University Press.
- Arbib, Michael A.; Robinson, J. Alan, eds. (1990). Natural and Artificial Parallel Computation. MIT Press. ISBN 0-262-01120-4.
- Robinson, J. A. (1979). Logic: Form and Function. Edinburgh University Press. ISBN 0-85224-305-7.
- Robinson, John Alan (January 1965). "A Machine-Oriented Logic Based on the Resolution Principle". J. ACM. 12 (1): 23–41. doi:10.1145/321250.321253. S2CID 14389185.
- Robinson, John Alan (1957). Causation, Probability and Testimony (PhD thesis). Princeton University. OCLC 83304635.

== See also ==
- Robinson resolvent method — an alternative to the Quine–McCluskey algorithm for Boolean function minimization
