= History of the Standard Template Library =

History of the STL, a C++ software library

In computing, the Standard Template Library (STL) is a software library for the C++ programming language. The architecture of the STL is largely the creation of Alexander Stepanov. In 1979 he began working out his initial ideas of generic programming and exploring their potential for revolutionizing software development. Although David Musser had developed and advocated some aspects of generic programming already by 1971, it was limited to a rather specialized area of software development (computer algebra).

== Conception ==
Stepanov recognized the full potential for generic programming and persuaded his then-colleagues at General Electric Research and Development (including, primarily, David Musser and Deepak Kapur) that generic programming should be pursued as a comprehensive basis for software development. At the time there was no real support in any programming language for generic programming.

The first major language to provide such support was Ada (ANSI standard 1983), with its generic units feature. In 1985, the Eiffel programming language became the first object-oriented language to include intrinsic support for generic classes, combined with the object-oriented notion of inheritance. By 1987 Stepanov and Musser had developed and published an Ada library for list processing that embodied the results of much of their research on generic programming. However, Ada had not achieved much acceptance outside the defense industry and C++ seemed more likely to become widely used and provide good support for generic programming even though the language was relatively immature. Another reason for turning to C++, which Stepanov recognized early on, was the C/C++ model of computation that allows very flexible access to storage via pointers, which is crucial to achieving generality without losing efficiency.

== Development ==
Much research and experimentation were needed, not just to develop individual components, but to develop an overall architecture for a component library based on generic programming. First at AT&T Bell Laboratories and later at Hewlett-Packard Research Labs (HP), Stepanov experimented with many architectural and algorithm formulations, first in C and later in C++. Musser collaborated in this research and in 1992 Meng Lee joined Stepanov's project at HP and became a major contributor.

This work undoubtedly would have continued for some time being just a research project or at best would have resulted in an HP proprietary library, if Andrew Koenig of Bell Labs had not become aware of the work and asked Stepanov to present the main ideas at a November 1993 meeting of the ANSI/ISO committee for C++ standardization. The committee's response was overwhelmingly favorable and led to a request from Koenig for a formal proposal in time for the March 1994 meeting. Despite the tremendous time pressure, Alex and Meng were able to produce a draft proposal that received preliminary approval at that meeting.

The committee had several requests for changes and extensions (some of them major), and a small group of committee members met with Stepanov and Lee to help work out the details. The requirements for the most significant extension (associative containers) had to be shown to be consistent by fully implementing them, a task Stepanov delegated to Musser. Stepanov and Lee produced a proposal that received final approval at the July 1994 ANSI/ISO committee meeting. (Additional details of this history can be found in Stevens.) Subsequently, the Stepanov and Lee document 17 was incorporated into the ANSI/ISO C++ draft standard (1, parts of clauses 17 through 27). It also influenced other parts of the C++ Standard Library, such as the string facilities, and some of the previously adopted standards in those areas were revised accordingly.

In spite of STL's success with the committee, there remained the question of how STL would make its way into actual availability and use. With the STL requirements part of the publicly available draft standard, compiler vendors and independent software library vendors could of course develop their own implementations and market them as separate products or as selling points for their other wares. One of the first edition's authors, Atul Saini, was among the first to recognize the commercial potential and began exploring it as a line of business for his company, Modena Software Incorporated, even before STL had been fully accepted by the committee.

The prospects for early widespread dissemination of STL were considerably improved with Hewlett-Packard's decision to make its implementation freely available on the Internet in August 1994. This implementation, developed by Stepanov, Lee, and Musser during the standardization process, became the basis of many implementations offered by compiler and library vendors today.
