= Melvin Fitting =

American philosopher

- Born: 24 January 1942 (age 84)
- Education: Rensselaer Polytechnic Institute; Yeshiva University
- Awards: Herbrand Award by CADE, June 2012
- Scientific career
- Fields: Mathematics, philosophy, computer science
- Workplaces: Lehman College; CUNY Graduate Center
- Doctoral advisor: Raymond Smullyan

Melvin Fitting (born January 24, 1942) is a logician with special interests in philosophical logic and tableau proof systems. He was a professor at Lehman College and the Graduate Center of the City University of New York from 1968 to 2013. At the Graduate Center he was in the departments of Computer Science, Philosophy, and Mathematics, and at Lehman College he was in the department of Mathematics and Computer Science. He is now Professor emeritus.

Fitting was born in Troy, New York. His undergraduate degree is from Rensselaer Polytechnic Institute, and his doctorate is from Yeshiva University, both in mathematics. His thesis advisor was Raymond Smullyan.

In June 2012 Melvin Fitting was given the Herbrand Award by the Conference on Automated Deduction, for distinguished contributions to automated deduction. (Note: Leading Mathematics and Computer Sciences Researcher Wins Prestigious Award)

A loose motivation for much of Melvin Fitting's work can be formulated succinctly as follows. There are many logics. Our principles of reasoning vary with context and subject matter. Multiplicity is one of the glories of modern formal logic. The common thread tying logics together is a concern for what can be said (syntax), what that means (semantics), and relationships between the two. A philosophical position that can be embodied in a formal logic has been shown to be coherent, not correct. Logic is a tool, not a master, but it is an enjoyable tool to use.
