= Palamidessi =

Palamidessi is an Italian surname. Notable people with the surname include:

- Catuscia Palamidessi (born 1959), Italian computer scientist
- Christine Palamidessi, American writer and artist
- Tommaso Palamidessi (1915–1983), Italian fringe philosopher
