= Peter B. Andrews =

American mathematician (1937–2025)

Peter Bruce Andrews
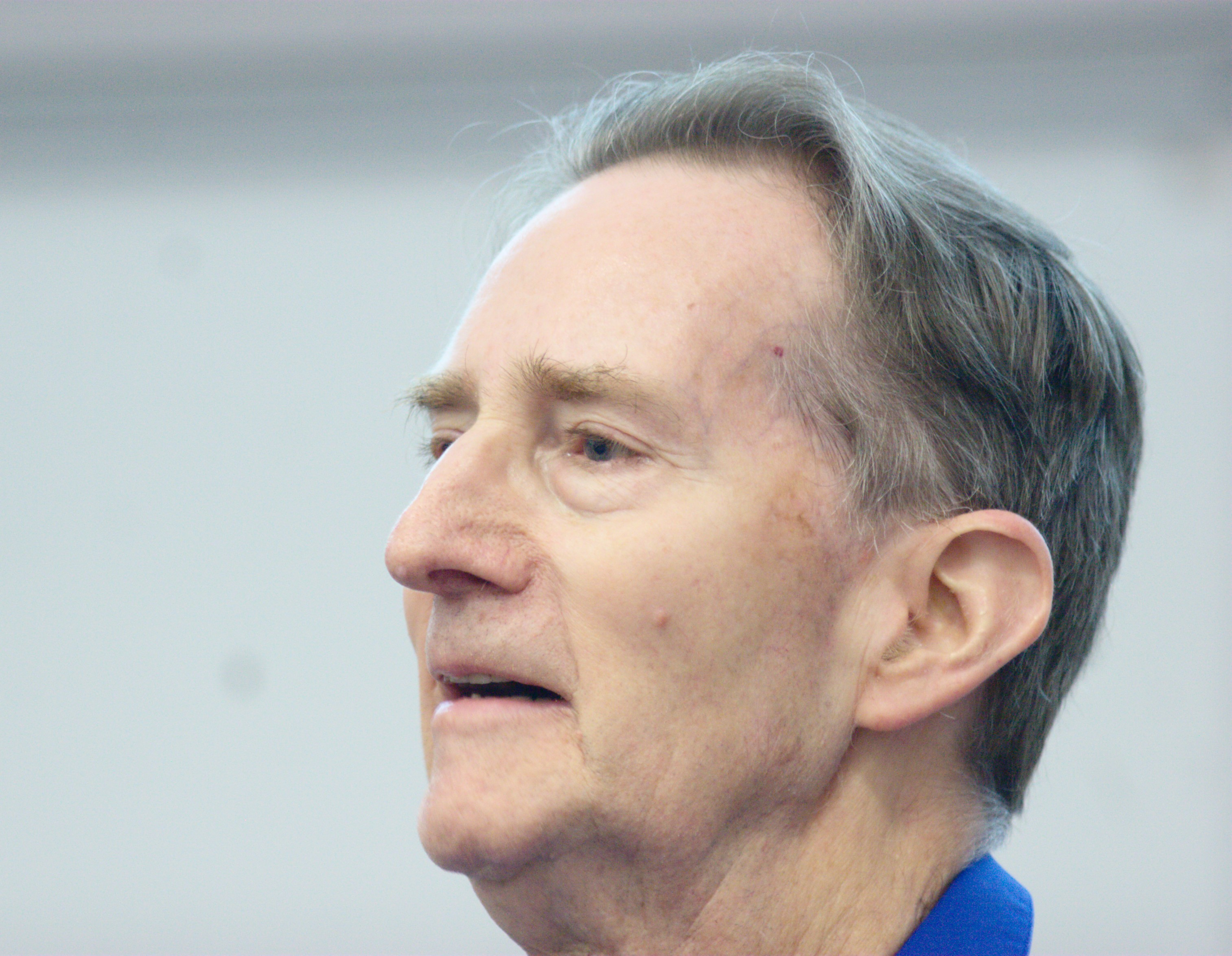
- Peter Andrews presenting lecture at IJCAR 2012
- Born: November 1, 1937; New York City
- Died: April 21, 2025 (aged 87); Burlington, NC
- Known for: Q0 (mathematical logic), TPS
- Spouse: Catherine Clair "Cate" Andrews
- Children: Lyle, Bruce (Tobi)
- Parent(s): Frank Emerson, Edith Lilian Severance
- Awards: Herbrand Award, 2003

Academic background
- Education: Ph.D. in Mathematics
- Alma mater: Princeton University
- Thesis: A Transfinite Type Theory with Type Variables (1964)
- Doctoral advisor: Alonzo Church

Academic work
- Discipline: Mathematical logic
- Sub-discipline: Type theory
- Institutions: Carnegie Mellon University
- Doctoral students: Frank Pfenning; Dale Miller; Michael Kohlhase
- Influenced: Wolfgang Bibel
- Website: Peter B. Andrews, archived from the original on 2022-01-19

Peter Bruce Andrews (November 1, 1937 – April 21, 2025) was an American mathematical logician. He is the creator of the mathematical logic Q_{0}. He also received a patent for a bandage system that allows access to wounds without the need to remove the bandage completely.

== Theorem Proving System ==
His research group designed the TPS, an automated theorem proving system for first-order and higher-order logic. A subsystem ETPS of TPS is used to help students learn logic by interactively constructing natural deduction proofs. Source code of TPS is available on the Internet Archive.

== Selected publications ==
A list is available on his personal web page.

- Andrews, Peter B. (1965). A Transfinite Type Theory with Type Variables. North Holland Publishing Company, Amsterdam.
- Andrews, Peter B. (1971). "Resolution in type theory". Journal of Symbolic Logic 36, 414–432.
- Andrews, Peter B. (1981). "Theorem proving via general matings". J. Assoc. Comput. March. 28, no. 2, 193–214.
- Andrews, Peter B. (1986). An introduction to mathematical logic and type theory: to truth through proof. Computer Science and Applied Mathematics. ISBN 978-0-1205-8535-9. Academic Press, Inc., Orlando, FL.
- Andrews, Peter B. (1989). "On connections and higher-order logic". J. Automat. Reason. 5, no. 3, 257–291.
- Andrews, Peter B.; Bishop, Matthew; Issar, Sunil; Nesmith, Dan; Pfenning, Frank; Xi, Hongwei (1996). "TPS: a theorem-proving system for classical type theory". J. Automat. Reason. 16, no. 3, 321–353.
- Andrews, Peter B. (2002). An introduction to mathematical logic and type theory: to truth through proof. Second edition. Applied Logic Series, 27. ISBN 978-1-4020-0763-7. Kluwer Academic Publishers, Dordrecht.
