= Association for Automated Reasoning =

The Association for Automated Reasoning (AAR) is a non-profit corporation that serves as an association of researchers working on automated theorem proving, automated reasoning, and related fields. It organizes the CADE and IJCAR conferences and publishes a roughly quarterly newsletter.

The website of the association is maintained by Valentin Montmirail and Geoff Sutcliffe in Jekyll.
