= Dale Miller =

Dale Miller may refer to:

- Dale Miller (politician)
- Dale Miller (computer scientist)
