= EasyChair =

- Developer: Andrei Voronkov
- Written in: Perl
- Operating system: Linux
- Type: Academic conference abstract management
- Website: easychair.org

EasyChair is a web-based conference management software system. It has been used since 2002 in the scientific community for tasks such as organising research paper submission and review. In 2012, EasyChair added an open access online publication service for conference proceedings.

== Description ==
EasyChair is a paid web-based conference management software system used, among other tasks, to organize paper submission and review, similar to other event management system software such as OpenConf. EasyChair used to be run by the Department of Computer Science at the University of Manchester but now it is a commercial service, owned by EasyChair Ltd. in Stockport (established 2016). EasyChair used to be free, for standard service, but as of 2022, only minimal services are free.

The EasyChair website also provides an open access online publication service for conference proceedings. When launched in 2012, the service was for computer science only, but in 2016 it was expanded to all sciences.

== History ==
The EasyChair software has been in continuous development since 2002. As of 2015, the code base consists of nearly 300,000 lines of code, and it has been used by more than 41,000 conferences. More than two and a half million users in the scientific community reported using it in 2019.

== See also ==
- Abstract management
- Academic conference
