= Martha Palmer =

American computer scientist

Martha (Stone) Palmer
- Education: University of Texas at Austin (MA); University of Edinburgh (PhD)
- Known for: PropBank; VerbNet
- Awards: ACL Fellow (2014); AAAI Fellow (2020)
- Scientific career
- Fields: Computer Science; Natural Language Processing; Computational Linguistics
- Workplaces: University of Pennsylvania; University of Colorado Boulder
- Thesis: Driving semantics for a limited domain (1985)
- Doctoral advisor: Alan Bundy
- Website: www.colorado.edu/faculty/palmer-martha/

Martha (Stone) Palmer is an American computer scientist. She is best known for her work on verb semantics, and for the creation of ontological resources such as PropBank and VerbNet.

== Education ==
Palmer received a Master of Arts in Computer Science from University of Texas at Austin in 1976, advised by Robert Simmons.

She received her PhD from the University of Edinburgh in 1985. Her thesis was titled "Driving semantics for a limited domain", and was advised by Alan Bundy.

== Career ==
Palmer is currently a professor of computer science and linguistics at the University of Colorado Boulder. She was previously on the faculty of the University of Pennsylvania.

In 2026, she was appointed to the UN Independent International Scientific Panel on AI.

=== Awards and honors ===
Palmer served as president of the Association for Computational Linguistics in 2005 and was named an ACL Fellow in 2014 "for significant contributions to computational semantics and the development of semantic corpora".

In 2017, she was awarded the Helen & Hubert Croft (endowed) Professorship by the University of Colorado. In the same year, the university named her a "Professor of Distinction", a title reserved for professors who have received international recognition for their research. She was elected an AAAI Fellow in 2020 "for significant contributions to natural language processing and knowledge representation, including widely-used corpora of annotated structures in several languages". In 2023, she was awarded the ACL Lifetime achievement award, the highest distinction by the Association for Computational Linguistics, for her lifetime work on verb semantics.
