= Jasmin Blanchette =

German academic

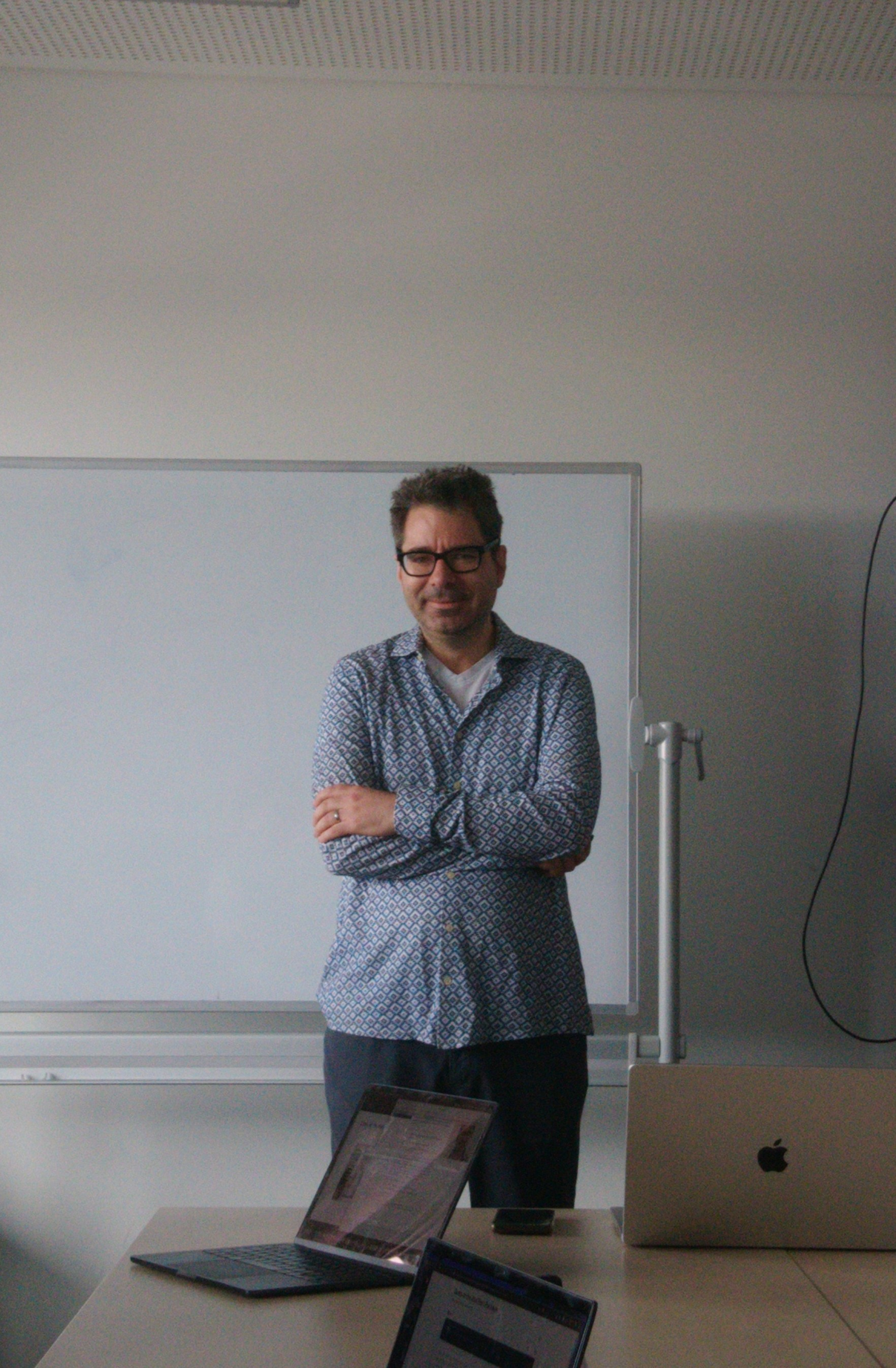
- Blanchette in Bamberg (2025)
- Born: Jasmin Christian Blanchette

Academic background
- Education: Université de Sherbrooke (BS); University of Oslo (MS); Technical University of Munich (PhD)

Academic work
- Discipline: Computer science
- Sub-discipline: Theoretical computer science

Jasmin Christian Blanchette is a computer scientist working as a professor of theoretical computer science at LMU Munich.

== Education ==
Blanchette earned a Bachelor of Science degree in computer science from the Université de Sherbrooke, a Master of Science in computer science from the University of Oslo, and a PhD in computer science from the Technical University of Munich.

== Career ==
Blanchette is the editor-in-chief of the Journal of Automated Reasoning. He is also a guest researcher at the University of Lorraine and the Max Planck Institute for Informatics. He was previously an associate professor at the Vrije Universiteit Amsterdam and a software engineer and documentation manager for Trolltech (now The Qt Company).
