= Andrei Voronkov (computer scientist) =

Professor of Formal methods

- Андрей Анатольевич Воронков
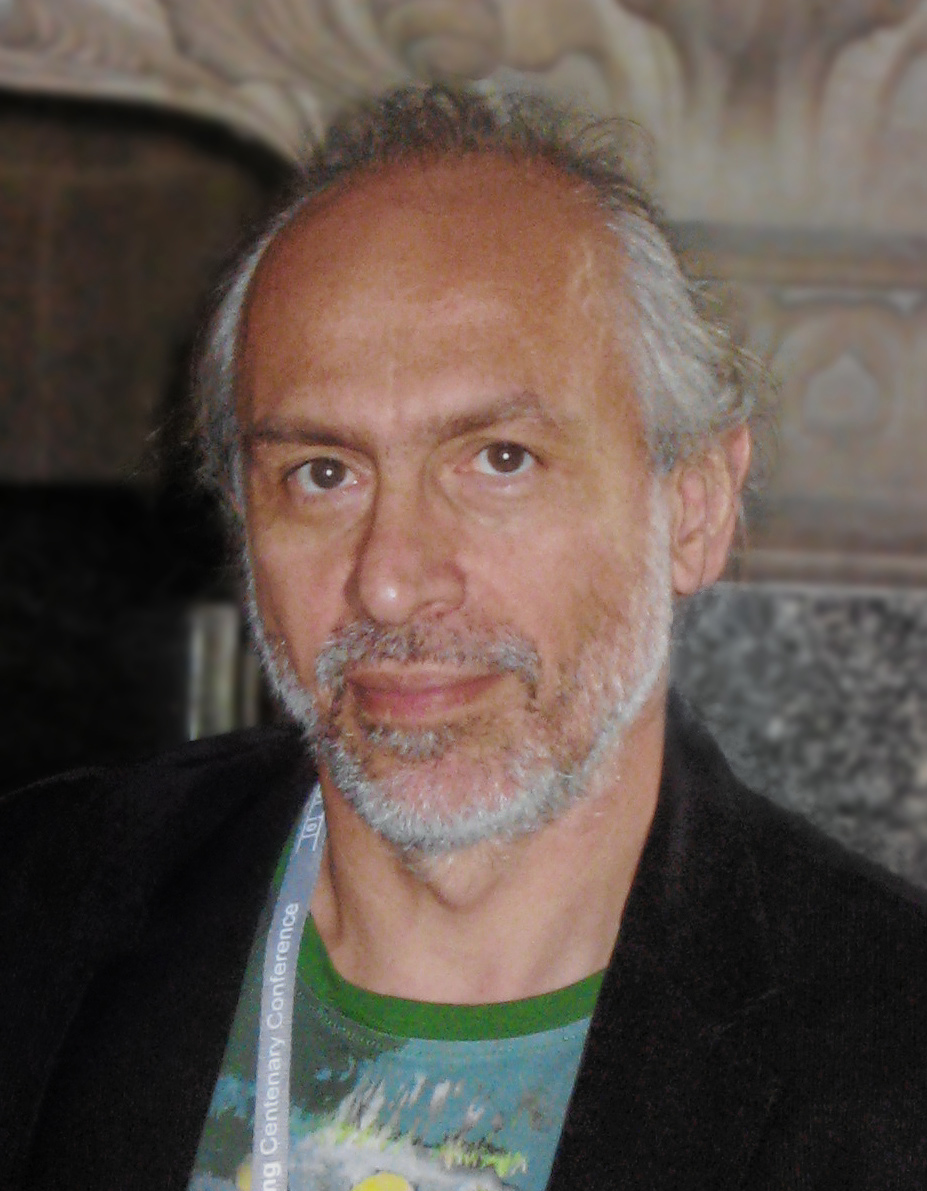
- Andrei Voronkov at the Alan Turing Centenary Conference, June 24th, 2012
- Born: Andrei Anatolievič Voronkov; May 14, 1959 (age 67)
- Education: Novosibirsk State University
- Known for: Vampire theorem prover; EasyChair
- Awards: 45 division titles in CASC since 1999; Herbrand Award (2015)
- Scientific career
- Fields: Formal methods
- Workplaces: University of Manchester; Novosibirsk State University
- Thesis: Realizability and Program Synthesis (1987)
- Website: voronkov.com; manchester.ac.uk/research/andrei.voronkov

Andrei Anatolievič Voronkov (born 1959) is a Professor of Formal methods in the Department of Computer Science at the University of Manchester.

== Education ==
Voronkov was educated at Novosibirsk State University, graduating with a PhD in 1987.

== Research ==
Voronkov is known for the Vampire automated theorem prover, the EasyChair conference management software, the Handbook of Automated Reasoning (with John Alan Robinson, 2001), and as organiser of the Alan Turing Centenary Conference 2012.

Voronkov's research has been funded by the Engineering and Physical Sciences Research Council (EPSRC).

== Awards and honours ==
In 2015, his contributions to the field of automated reasoning were recognized with the Herbrand Award. He has won 25 division titles in the CADE ATP System Competition (CASC) at the Conference on Automated Deduction (CADE) since 1999.
