= Mark E. Stickel =

American computer scientist

- Born: June 22, 1947
- Died: April 13, 2013 (aged 65)
- Occupation: computer scientist
- Known for: automated theorem proving and artificial intelligence
- Notable work: SNARK
- Awards: Fellow, American Association for Artificial Intelligence, Herbrand Award

Mark E. Stickel (June 22, 1947 – April 13, 2013) was a computer scientist working in the fields of automated theorem proving and artificial intelligence. He worked at SRI International for over 30 years, and was principal scientist at the Artificial Intelligence Center.

Stickel's research included Theory Resolution, Associative-Commutative (AC) Unification, and the development of the Prolog Technology Theorem Prover (PTTP) and SNARK, SRI's New Automated Reasoning Kit.

He was elected fellow of the American Association for Artificial Intelligence in 1992 and received the Herbrand Award for his contributions to automated deduction in 2002.
