= Larry Wos =

American mathematician (1930–2020)

- Born: Lawrence T. Wos; 1930; Chicago, U.S.
- Died: August 21, 2020
- Known for: Theorem proving
- Awards: Herbrand Award (1992)
- Scientific career
- Thesis: On Commutative Prime Power Subgroups of the Norm (1957)

Lawrence T. Wos (1930–2020) was an American mathematician, a researcher in the Mathematics and Computer Science Division of Argonne National Laboratory.

== Biography ==
Wos studied at the University of Chicago, receiving a bachelor's degree in 1950 and a master's in mathematics in 1954, and went on for doctoral studies at the University of Illinois at Urbana-Champaign where he received PhD in 1957 supervised by Reinhold Baer. He joined Argonne in 1957, and began using computers to prove mathematical theorems in 1963.

Wos was congenitally blind. He was an avid bowler, the best male blind bowler in the US.

== Awards and honors ==
In 1982, Wos and his colleague Steve Winker were the first to win the Automated Theorem Proving Prize, given by the American Mathematical Society. In 1992, Wos was the first to win the Herbrand Award for his contributions to the field of automated deduction. A festschrift in his honor, Automated reasoning and its applications: essays in honor of Larry Wos (Robert Veroff, ed.) was published by the MIT Press in 1997 (ISBN 0-262-22055-5).

== Books ==
Wos and Gail W. Pieper are the coauthors of the books A Fascinating Country in the World of Computing: Your Guide to Automated Reasoning (World Scientific, 1999, ISBN 978-981-02-3910-7) and Automated Reasoning and the Discovery of Missing and Elegant Proofs (Rinton Press, 2003, ISBN 1-58949-023-1). Wos's collected works were published by World Scientific in 2000, in two volumes (ISBN 978-981-02-4001-1).
