= Alan Bundy =

British artificial intelligence researcher (born 1947)

Alan Bundy CBE FRS FRSE FREng
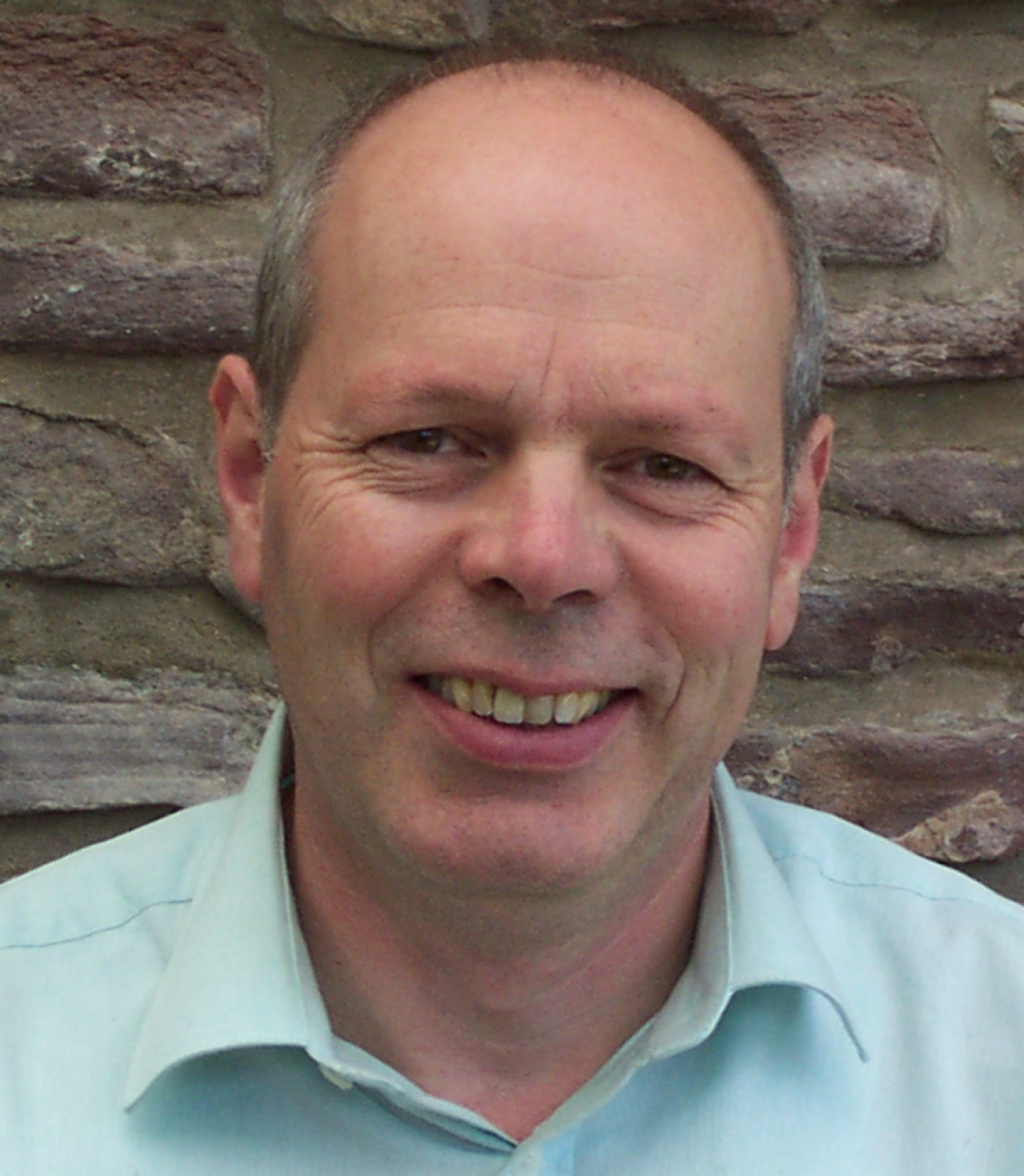
- Born: Alan Richard Bundy; 18 May 1947 (age 79); Isleworth, West London, England
- Education: University of Leicester (BSc, PhD)
- Awards: AAAI Fellow (1990); ACM Fellow (2014); IJCAI Award (2007); Herbrand Award (2007)
- Scientific career
- Fields: Automated reasoning; Automated theorem proving; Artificial intelligence; Formal methods; Ontology evolution
- Workplaces: University of Edinburgh
- Thesis: The Metatheory of the Elementary Equation Calculus (1971)
- Doctoral advisor: Reuben Goodstein
- Doctoral students: Simon Colton; Frank van Harmelen; Martha Palmer; Lincoln Wallen; Toby Walsh
- Website: homepages.inf.ed.ac.uk/bundy

Alan Richard Bundy (born 18 May 1947) is a professor at the School of Informatics at the University of Edinburgh, known for his contributions to automated reasoning, especially to proof planning, the use of meta-level reasoning to guide proof search.

== Education ==
Alan Bundy was educated as a mathematician, obtaining an honours degree in mathematics in 1968 from the University of Leicester and a PhD in mathematical logic in 1971, also from Leicester.

== Career and research ==
Since 1971, Bundy has worked at the University of Edinburgh: initially in the 'Metamathematics' Unit, which in 1972 became the Department of Computational Logic, in 1974 was absorbed into the new Department of Artificial Intelligence, and in 1998 was absorbed into the new School of Informatics. From 1971 to 1973, he was a research fellow on Prof. B. Meltzer's Science and Engineering Research Council (SERC) grant Theorem Proving by Computer; in 1973, he was appointed a university lecturer; in 1984, he was promoted to reader; in 1987, he was promoted to professorial fellow; and in 1990, he was promoted to professor. From 1987 to 1992, he held a SERC Senior Fellowship. From 1998 to 2001 he was Head of the newly formed Division (subsequently School) of Informatics at Edinburgh.

From 2000 to 2005, he was a founder and convener of the UK Computing Research Committee, which plays an advocacy role for computing research in the UK. From 2010 to 2012, he served as a vice-president and trustee of the British Computer Society with special responsibility for the Academy of Computing.

=== Honours and awards ===
Bundy was a founding AAAI Fellow in 1990, and elected a Fellow of the Royal Society of Edinburgh (FRSE) in 1996, a founding fellow of SSAISB in 1997, a founding fellow of European Coordinating Committee for Artificial Intelligence (ECCAI) in 1999, a fellow of the British Computer Society in 2004, and a Fellow of the Institution of Electrical Engineers in 2005. He was elected a Fellow of the Royal Academy of Engineering (FREng) in 2008. He was elected an ACM Fellow in 2014 "For contributions to artificial intelligence, automated reasoning, and the formation and evolution of representations.".

He is the winner of the 2007 IJCAI Award for Research Excellence and Herbrand Award for Distinguished Contributions to Automated Deduction.

He was one of the 41 professors selected worldwide to receive one of the Hewlett-Packard Labs Innovation Research Awards 2008.

Bundy was appointed CBE in the 2012 New Year Honours for services to computing science. He was elected a Fellow of the Royal Society (FRS) in 2012, his certificate of election reads

Alan Bundy has made world-leading contributions to both automated reasoning and the automated formation and evolution of representations of knowledge. He has developed novel techniques with improved efficiency, range and behaviour. His work on automated reasoning has found application in hardware and software systems development, where it has increased the level of automation. It has decreased the skill level and development time required to verify computer programs and has been taken up by industry. His work on representation evolution facilitates communication between agencies with different representations of related knowledge.
