= Catuscia Palamidessi =

Computer scientist

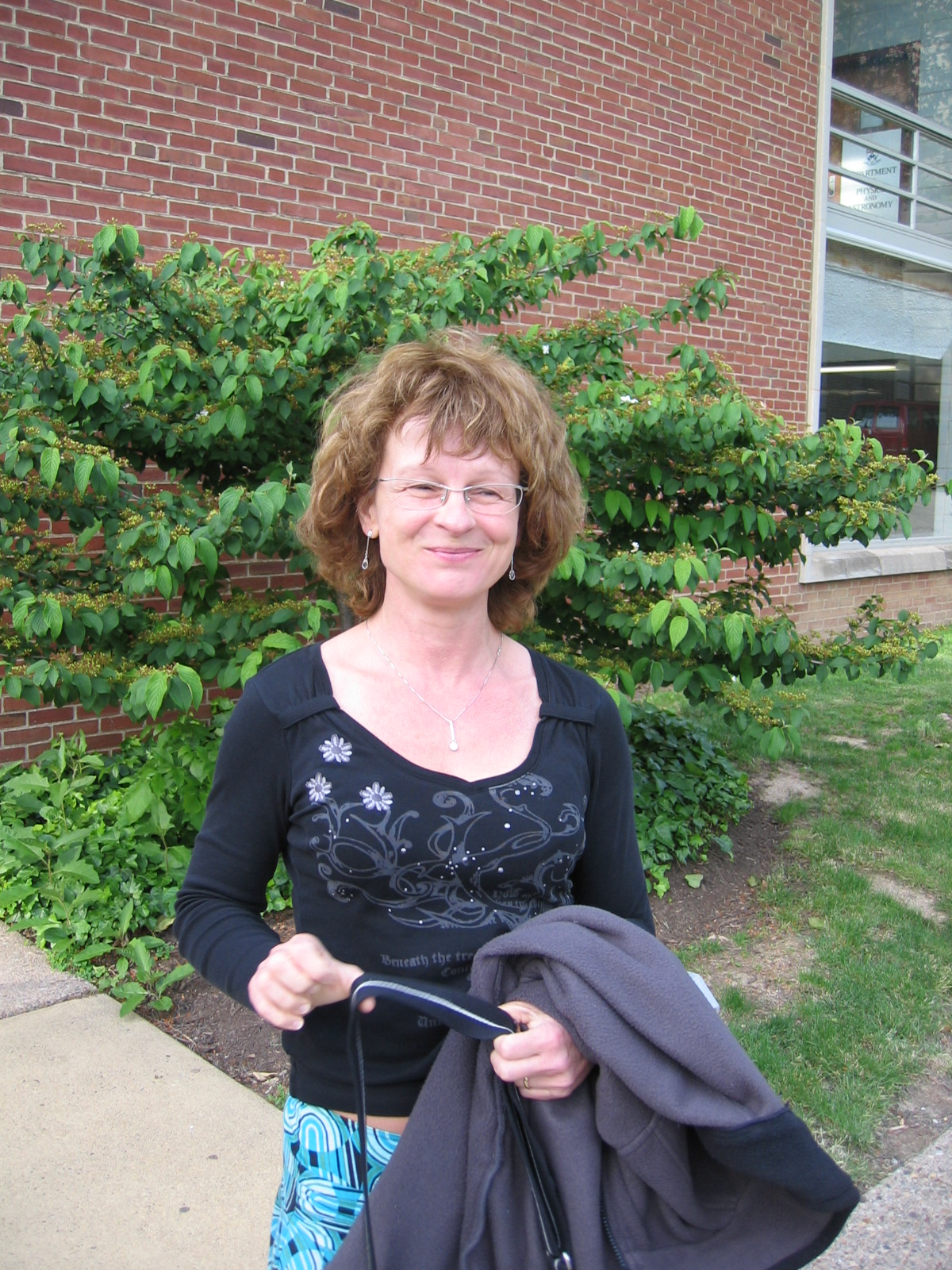
Palamidessi in 2008

Catuscia Palamidessi (born 1959) is a computer scientist whose research topics have included differential privacy, location obfuscation, fairness in machine learning, the logic of concurrent systems, and the design of programming languages that combine logic programming and functional programming. Originally from Italy, she has worked in Italy, the US, and France, where she is a director of research for the French Institute for Research in Computer Science and Automation (Inria).

== Education and career ==
Palamidessi was born in 1959 in Fucecchio, a small village in Tuscany, and when she began her studies at the University of Pisa, despite the discouragement of her parents, she became the first woman from that village to go to a university. Continuing her studies there, she earned a laurea in 1982 and a Ph.D. in 1988, with Giorgio Levi as her doctoral advisor.

She was an assistant professor at the University of Pisa from 1988 to 1992, an associate professor at the University of Genoa from 1992 to 1994, and a full professor at Genoa from 1994 to 1997. From 1998 to 2002 she worked as a professor at Pennsylvania State University in the US, and in 2002 she and her husband moved together to France as directors of research at Inria. At Inria, she is the leader of the Comète team, based at Paris-Saclay University, focused on formal methods in computer security and privacy.

== Recognition ==
In 2022, Palamidessi was awarded the Inria – French Academy of Sciences Grand Prize.

== Personal life ==
Palamidessi is married to Dale Miller, an American computer scientist who also works at Inria Saclay.
