= Federal Virtual World Challenge =

Competition

Federal Virtual Challenge
- FVC logo
- Genre: Science and Technology
- Date: March
- Frequency: Annually
- Inaugurated: 2010
- Patron: US Army
- People: Tami Griffith
- Member: United States Army Simulation and Training Technology Center
- Website: fvwc.army.mil

The Federal Virtual Challenge, formerly The Federal Virtual Worlds Challenge is a competition led by the Simulation and Training Technology Center (United States Army Research, Development and Engineering Command). The event is conducted in order to reach a global development community that will create innovative and interactive training and analysis services in virtual worlds. The inaugural event began in 2009 with the awards being conducted during March 2010 GameTech conference in Orlando, Florida.

== Description ==
The focus of the challenge is training or analysis capability conducted wholly in a virtual environment. The training and analysis audience includes all United States Federal Agencies including, Department of Defense, Department of Homeland Security, Department of Transportation, and Department of Health and Human Services, NASA, DOT, and many more.
