= Franz Baader =

German computer scientist

- Born: 15 June 1959 (age 66)
- Scientific career
- Institutions: Dresden University of Technology, RWTH Aachen University, University of Erlangen-Nuremberg, German Research Centre for Artificial Intelligence
- Thesis: Unifikation und Reduktionssysteme für Halbgruppenvarietäten (1989)
- Doctoral advisor: Klaus Leeb
- Doctoral students: Ulrike Sattler
- Website: lat.inf.tu-dresden.de/~baader/index-en.html

Franz Baader (15 June 1959, Spalt) is a German computer scientist at Dresden University of Technology.

He received his PhD in Computer Science in 1989 from the University of Erlangen-Nuremberg, Germany, where he was a teaching and research assistant for 4 years. In 1989, he went to the German Research Centre for Artificial Intelligence (DFKI) as a senior researcher and project leader.

In 1993 he became associate professor for computer science at RWTH Aachen, and in 2002 full professor for computer science at TU Dresden.

He received the Herbrand Award for the year 2020 "in recognition of his significant contributions to unification theory, combinations of theories and reasoning in description logics".

== Works ==
- Baader, Franz; Nipkow, Tobias (1998). Term Rewriting and All That. Cambridge University Press.
- Baader, Franz (2003). The description logic handbook: theory, implementation, and applications. Cambridge University Press. ISBN 978-0-521-78176-3.
- Baader, Franz; Voronkov, Andrei (2005). Logic for programming, artificial intelligence, and reasoning: 11th international conference. Springer. ISBN 978-3-540-25236-8.
- Baader, Franz; Horrocks, Ian; Lutz, Carsten; Sattler, Uli (2017). An Introduction to Description Logic. Cambridge University Press. ISBN 978-0-521-87361-1.
