= Harald Ganzinger =

German computer scientist

- Born: 31 October 1950; Werneck
- Died: 3 June 2004 (aged 53); Saarbrücken
- Education: Technical University of Munich
- Known for: superposition calculus
- Awards: Herbrand Award
- Scientific career
- Fields: computer science
- Workplaces: University of Dortmund; Max Planck Institute for Computer Science

Harald Ganzinger (31 October 1950, Werneck – 3 June 2004, Saarbrücken) was a German computer scientist who together with Leo Bachmair developed the superposition calculus, which is (as of 2007) used in most of the state-of-the-art automated theorem provers for first-order logic.

He received his Ph.D. from the Technical University of Munich in 1978. Before 1991 he was a Professor of Computer Science at University of Dortmund. Then he joined the Max Planck Institute for Computer Science in Saarbrücken shortly after it was founded in 1991. Until 2004 he was the Director of the Programming Logics department of the Max Planck Institute for Computer Science and honorary professor at Saarland University. His research group created the SPASS automated theorem prover.

He received the Herbrand Award in 2004 (posthumous) for his important contributions to automated theorem proving.
