= David Plaisted =

American computer scientist

David Alan Plaisted is a computer science professor at the University of North Carolina at Chapel Hill.

== Research interests ==
Plaisted's research interests include term rewriting systems, automated theorem proving, logic programming, and algorithms. His research accomplishments in theorem proving include work on the recursive path ordering, the associative path ordering, abstraction, the simplified and modified problem reduction formats, ground reducibility, nonstandard clause form translations, rigid E-unification, Knuth–Bendix completion, replacement rules in theorem proving, instance-based theorem proving strategies, and semantics in theorem proving.

== Education and career ==
He received his B.S. from the University of Chicago in 1970 and his Ph.D. from Stanford University in 1976. He served on the faculty of the computer science department at the University of Illinois at Urbana-Champaign until 1984, and since then has been a full professor in the Department of Computer Science at the University of North Carolina at Chapel Hill. He has authored or co-authored publications in computer science, which are cited by academics in this field. He has served on a number of program committees and on the editorial boards of a number of journals, including the Journal of Symbolic Computation, Information Processing Letters, Mathematical Systems Theory, and Fundamenta Informaticae. Plaisted spent a sabbatical at SRI International in Menlo Park, California in 1982 and 1983 and another at the Max Planck Institute for Software Systems and the University of Kaiserslautern in Germany in 1993 and 1994.
