= Conference on Automated Deduction =

The Conference on Automated Deduction (CADE) is the premier academic conference on automated deduction and related fields. The first CADE was organized in 1974 at the Argonne National Laboratory near Chicago. Most CADE meetings have been held in Europe and the United States. However, conferences have been held all over the world. Since 1996, CADE has been held yearly. In 2001, CADE was, for the first time, merged into the International Joint Conference on Automated Reasoning (IJCAR). This has been repeated biannually since 2004.

In 1996, CADE Inc. was formed as a non-profit sub-corporation of the Association for Automated Reasoning to organize the formerly individually organized conferences.

Nr	Proceedings	Date	Year	Location	Editor(s)
	LNAI				
01			1975		
02			1976		
03			1977		
04			1979		
05	0087		1980	Les Arcs, France	Wolfgang Bibel, Robert Kowalski
06	0138		1982	New York, USA	Donald W. Loveland
07	0170	May 14–16	1984	Napa, California, USA	Robert Shostak
08	0230	Jul 27 – Aug 1	1986	Oxford, England	Jörg H. Siekmann
09	0310	May 23–26	1988	Argonne, Illinois, USA	E. Lusk, Ross A. Overbeek
10	0449		1990	Kaiserslautern, Germany	Mark Stickel
11	0607	Jun 15–18	1992	Saratoga Springs, USA	D. Kapur
12	0814	Jun 26 – Jul 1	1994	Nancy, France	Alan Bundy
13	1104	Jul 30 – Aug 3	1996	New Brunswick, NJ, USA	Michael A. McRobbie, J.K. Slaney
14	1249	Jul 13–17	1997	Townsville, North Queensland, Australia	William McCune
15	1421	Jul 5–10	1998	Lindau, Germany	Claude Kirchner, Hélène Kirchner
16	1632	Jul 7–10	1999	Trento, Italy	Harald Ganzinger
17	1831	Jun 17–20	2000	Pittsburgh, PA, USA	David A. McAllester
18	2392	Jul 27–30	2002	Copenhagen, Denmark	Andrei Voronkov
19	2741	Jul 28 – Aug 2	2003	Miami Beach, FL, USA	Franz Baader
20	3632	Jul 22–27	2005	Tallinn, Estonia	Robert Nieuwenhuis
21	4603	Jul 17–20	2007	Bremen, Germany	Frank Pfenning
22	5663	Aug 2–7	2009	Montreal, Canada	Renate A. Schmidt
23	6803	Jul 31 – Aug 5	2011	Wrocław, Poland	Nikolaj Bjørner, Viorica Sofronie-Stokkermans
24	7898	Jun 9–14	2013	Lake Placid, New York, USA	Maria Paola Bonacina
25	9195	Aug 1–7	2015	Berlin, Germany	Amy Felty, Aart Middeldorp
26	10395	Aug 6–11	2017	Gothenburg, Sweden	Leonardo de Moura
27	11716	Aug 23–30	2019	Natal, Brazil	Pascal Fontaine
28	12699	Jul 12–15	2021	~~Pittsburgh, USA~~ (virtual)	André Platzer, Geoff Sutcliffe
29	14132	Jul 1–4	2023	Rome, Italy	Brigitte Pientka, Cesare Tinelli
30		Jul 28 – Aug 2	2025	Stuttgart, Germany	
