= International Joint Conference on Automated Reasoning =

Conferences series on automated reasoning, automated deduction, and related fields

The International Joint Conference on Automated Reasoning (IJCAR) is a series of conferences on the topics of automated reasoning, automated deduction, and related fields. It is organized semi-regularly as a merger of other meetings. IJCAR replaces those independent conferences in the years it takes place. The conference is organized by the organizers of the Conference on Automated Deduction (CADE), and CADE has always been one of the conferences partaking in IJCAR.

- The first IJCAR was held in Siena, Italy on 18–22 June 2001, as a merger of CADE, FTP, and TABLEAUX, and which included the IJCAR ATP System Competition (CASC-JC) on 21 June 2001.
- The second IJCAR was held in Cork, Ireland in 2004 as a merger of CADE, FTP, TABLEAUX, FroCoS and CALCULEMUS.
- The third IJCAR was held as an independent subconference of the fourth Federated Logic Conference in Seattle, United States, and merged CADE, FTP, TABLEAUX, FroCoS and TPHOLs.
- The fourth IJCAR was held in Sydney, Australia in 2008, and merged CADE, FroCoS, FTP and TABLEAUX.
- The fifth IJCAR was held in 2010 as an independent subconference of the fifth Federated Logic Conference in Edinburgh, UK, and merged CADE, FTP, TABLEAUX, and FroCoS.
- The sixth IJCAR was held in Manchester, UK, as part of the Alan Turing Year 2012, and was collocated with the Alan Turing Centenary Conference. It again merged CADE, FTP, TABLEAUX, and FroCoS.
- The seventh IJCAR was held in Vienna, Austria, as part of the Vienna Summer of Logic in 2014, and merged CADE, TABLEAUX, and FroCoS.
- The eighth IJCAR was held in Coimbra, Portugal, in 2016, and merged CADE, TABLEAUX, and FroCoS.
