= Journal of Automated Reasoning =

- Discipline: Computer science
- Language: English
- Edited by: Jasmin Blanchette

Publication details
- History: 1983–present
- Publisher: Springer Science+Business Media
- Frequency: 8/year
- Impact factor: 1.431 (2019)

Standard abbreviations
- ISO 4: J. Autom. Reason.
- MathSciNet: J. Automat. Reason.

Indexing
- CODEN: JAREEW
- ISSN: 0168-7433 (print); 1573-0670 (web)
- LCCN: sf93093541
- OCLC no.: 263592661

Links
- Journal homepage; Online access

The Journal of Automated Reasoning was established in 1983 by Larry Wos, who was its editor in chief until 1992. It covers research and advances in automated reasoning, mechanical verification of theorems, and other deductions in classical and non-classical logic.

The journal is published by Springer Science+Business Media. As of 2021, the editor-in-chief is Jasmin Blanchette, a professor of theoretical computer science at the Ludwig-Maximilians-Universität München. The journal's 2019 impact factor is 1.431, and it is indexed by several science indexing services, including the Science Citation Index Expanded and Scopus.
