= Automated reasoning =

Subfield of computer science and logic

In computer science, in particular in knowledge representation and reasoning and metalogic, the area of automated reasoning is dedicated to understanding different aspects of reasoning. The study of automated reasoning helps produce computer programs that allow computers to reason completely, or nearly completely, automatically. Although automated reasoning is considered a sub-field of artificial intelligence, it also has connections with theoretical computer science and philosophy.

The most developed subareas of automated reasoning are automated theorem proving (and the less automated but more pragmatic subfield of interactive theorem proving) and automated proof checking (viewed as guaranteed correct reasoning under fixed assumptions). Extensive work has also been done in reasoning by analogy using induction and abduction.

Other important topics include reasoning under uncertainty and non-monotonic reasoning. An important part of the uncertainty field is that of argumentation, where further constraints of minimality and consistency are applied on top of the more standard automated deduction. John Pollock's OSCAR system is an example of an automated argumentation system that is more specific than being just an automated theorem prover.

Tools and techniques of automated reasoning include the classical logics and calculi, fuzzy logic, Bayesian inference, reasoning with maximal entropy and many less formal ad hoc techniques.

In the 2020s, to enhance the ability of large language models to solve complex problems, AI researchers have designed reasoning language models that can spend additional time on the problem before generating an answer and neuro-symbolic architectures that use symbolic reasoning systems to prevent hallucinations.

== Early years ==
The development of formal logic played a big role in the field of automated reasoning, which itself led to the development of artificial intelligence. A formal proof is a proof in which every logical inference has been checked back to the fundamental axioms of mathematics. All the intermediate logical steps are supplied, without exception. No appeal is made to intuition, even if the translation from intuition to logic is routine. Thus, a formal proof is less intuitive and less susceptible to logical errors.

Some consider the Cornell Summer meeting of 1957, which brought together many logicians and computer scientists, as the origin of automated reasoning, or automated deduction. Others say that it began before that with the 1955 Logic Theorist program of Newell, Shaw and Simon, or with Martin Davis’ 1954 implementation of Presburger's decision procedure (which proved that the sum of two even numbers is even).

Automated reasoning, although a significant and popular area of research, went through an "AI winter" in the eighties and early nineties. The field subsequently revived, however. For example, in 2005, Microsoft started using verification technology in many of their internal projects and is planning to include a logical specification and checking language in their 2012 version of Visual C.

== Significant contributions ==
Principia Mathematica was a milestone work in formal logic written by Alfred North Whitehead and Bertrand Russell. Its purpose was to derive all or some of the mathematical expressions, in terms of symbolic logic. Principia Mathematica was initially published in three volumes in 1910, 1912 and 1913. It succeeded The Principles of Mathematics, a 1903 book by Bertrand Russell, in which Russell had presented his famous paradox and argued his thesis that mathematics and logic are identical.

Logic Theorist (LT) was the first ever program developed in 1956 by Allen Newell, Cliff Shaw and Herbert A. Simon to "mimic human reasoning" in proving theorems and was demonstrated on fifty-two theorems from chapter two of Principia Mathematica, proving thirty-eight of them. In addition to proving the theorems, the program found a proof for one of the theorems that was more elegant than the one provided by Whitehead and Russell. After an unsuccessful attempt at publishing their results, Newell, Shaw, and Herbert reported in their publication in 1958, The Next Advance in Operation Research:

"There are now in the world machines that think, that learn and that create. Moreover, their ability to do these things is going to increase rapidly until (in a visible future) the range of problems they can handle will be co- extensive with the range to which the human mind has been applied."

Examples of Formal Proofs

| Year | Theorem | Proof System | Formalizer | Traditional Proof |
|---|---|---|---|---|
| 1986 | First Incompleteness | Boyer–Moore | Shankar | Gödel |
| 1990 | Quadratic Reciprocity | Boyer–Moore | Russinoff | Eisenstein |
| 1996 | Fundamental- of Calculus | HOL Light | Harrison | Henstock |
| 2000 | Fundamental- of Algebra | Mizar | Milewski | Brynski |
| 2000 | Fundamental- of Algebra | Rocq (then: Coq) | Geuvers et al. | Kneser |
| 2004 | Four Color | Rocq (then: Coq) | Gonthier | Robertson et al. |
| 2004 | Prime Number | Isabelle | Avigad et al. | Selberg-Erdős |
| 2005 | Jordan Curve | HOL Light | Hales | Thomassen |
| 2005 | Brouwer Fixed Point | HOL Light | Harrison | Kuhn |
| 2006 | Flyspeck 1 | Isabelle | Bauer–Nipkow | Hales |
| 2007 | Cauchy Residue | HOL Light | Harrison | Classical |
| 2008 | Prime Number | HOL Light | Harrison | Analytic proof |
| 2012 | Feit–Thompson | Rocq (then: Coq) | Gonthier et al. | Bender, Glauberman and Peterfalvi |
| 2016 | Boolean Pythagorean triples problem | Formalized as SAT | Heule et al. | None |

== Proof systems ==
Boyer-Moore Theorem Prover (NQTHM)
The design of NQTHM was influenced by John McCarthy and Woody Bledsoe. Started in 1971 at Edinburgh, Scotland, this was a fully automatic theorem prover built using Pure Lisp. The main aspects of NQTHM were:
1. the use of Lisp as a working logic.
2. the reliance on a principle of definition for total recursive functions.
3. the extensive use of rewriting and "symbolic evaluation".
4. an induction heuristic based the failure of symbolic evaluation.

HOL Light
Written in OCaml, HOL Light is designed to have a simple and clean logical foundation and an uncluttered implementation. It is essentially another proof assistant for classical higher order logic.

Rocq
Developed in France, Rocq is another automated proof assistant, which can automatically extract executable programs from specifications, as either Objective CAML or Haskell source code. Properties, programs and proofs are formalized in the same language called the Calculus of Inductive Constructions (CIC).

== Applications ==
Automated reasoning has been most commonly used to build automated theorem provers. Oftentimes, however, theorem provers require some human guidance to be effective and so more generally qualify as proof assistants. In some cases such provers have come up with new approaches to proving a theorem. Logic Theorist is a good example of this. The program came up with a proof for one of the theorems in Principia Mathematica that was more efficient (requiring fewer steps) than the proof provided by Whitehead and Russell. Automated reasoning programs are being applied to solve a growing number of problems in formal logic, mathematics and computer science, logic programming, software and hardware verification, circuit design, and many others. The TPTP (Sutcliffe and Suttner 1998) is a library of such problems that is updated on a regular basis. There is also a competition among automated theorem provers held regularly at the CADE conference (Pelletier, Sutcliffe and Suttner 2002); the problems for the competition are selected from the TPTP library.

== See also ==
- Automated machine learning (AutoML)
- Automated theorem proving
- Semantic reasoner
- Program analysis (computer science)
- Applications of artificial intelligence
- Outline of artificial intelligence
- Casuistry
- Case-based reasoning
- Abductive reasoning
- Inference engine
- Commonsense reasoning
- List of mathematical discoveries by artificial intelligence

=== Conferences and workshops ===
- International Joint Conference on Automated Reasoning (IJCAR)
- Conference on Automated Deduction (CADE)

=== Journals ===
- Journal of Automated Reasoning

=== Communities ===
- Association for Automated Reasoning (AAR)
