= Chaff (disambiguation) =

Chaff is dry inedible plant material.

Chaff may also refer to:

- Chaff (countermeasure), a radar countermeasure for aircraft or other targets
- Chaff algorithm, an algorithm for solving instances of the boolean satisfiability problem
- Chaffing and winnowing, a method in cryptography to protect a message without encryption
- Chaff (newspaper), a former students' newspaper of Massey University Students' Association

== See also ==
- "Gumbo Chaff" or "Gombo Chaff", an American song
- Chaff cutter, a mechanical device for cutting straw or hay
