= Toniann Pitassi =

Canadian-American computer scientist

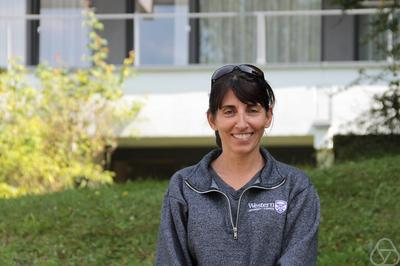
- Pitassi at the MFO workshop Proof Complexity and Beyond, 2017
- Education: Pennsylvania State University; University of Toronto
- Spouse: Richard Zemel
- Scientific career
- Fields: Mathematics, computer science
- Workplaces: University of Pittsburgh; University of Arizona; University of Toronto; Columbia University
- Doctoral advisor: Stephen Cook

Toniann Pitassi is a Canadian-American mathematician and computer scientist specializing in computational complexity theory. She is currently Jeffrey L. and Brenda Bleustein Professor of Engineering at Columbia University and was Bell Research Chair at the University of Toronto.

== Academic career ==
A native of Pittsburgh, Pitassi earned bachelor's and master's degrees at Pennsylvania State University before moving to the University of Toronto for her doctoral studies; she earned her PhD in 1992 from Toronto under the supervision of Stephen Cook. After postdoctoral studies at the University of California, San Diego and faculty positions at the University of Pittsburgh and University of Arizona, she returned to Toronto in 2001, and was a professor in the Department of Computer Science and Department of Mathematics at the University of Toronto until 2021, when she joined the faculty of Columbia University.

She was an invited speaker at International Congress of Mathematicians in Berlin in 1998. She was the program chair for the 2012 Symposium on Theory of Computing. From September through December 2017, she was a visiting professor at the Institute for Advanced Study.

== Research ==
Pitassi's research has largely focused on proof complexity, a branch of computational complexity theory that seeks upper and lower bounds on the lengths of mathematical proofs of logical propositions within various formalized proof systems. The goal of this study is to use these bounds to understand both the time complexity of proof-finding procedures, and the relative strengths of different proof systems.

Research contributions that she has made in this area include exponential lower bounds for Frege proofs of the pigeonhole principle, exponential lower bounds for the cutting-plane method applied to propositions derived from the maximum clique problem, exponential lower bounds for resolution proofs of dense random 3-satisfiability instances, and subexponential upper bounds for the same dense random instances using the Davis–Putnam algorithm. With various coauthors, she has several expositions and surveys: on proof complexity in general, on algebraic proof complexity, and on semialgebraic proof complexity.

== Recognition ==
Pitassi was elected as an ACM Fellow in 2018 for "contributions to research and education in the fields of computational and proof complexity".

Pitassi was also the recipient of the EATCS (European Association for Theoretical Computer Science) Award in 2021 for her "fundamental and wide-ranging contributions to computational complexity".

She was named to the National Academy of Sciences in 2022.

== Selected publications ==
- Pitassi, Toniann; Beame, Paul; Impagliazzo, Russell (1993), "Exponential lower bounds for the pigeonhole principle", Computational Complexity, 3 (2): 97–140, doi:10.1007/BF01200117, MR 1233662, S2CID 1046674.
- Beame, Paul; Pitassi, Toniann (1996), "Simplified and improved resolution lower bounds", Proceedings of the 37th Annual Symposium on Foundations of Computer Science, pp. 274–282, doi:10.1109/SFCS.1996.548486, ISBN 0-8186-7594-2, MR 1450625, S2CID 14341656.
- Bonet, Maria; Pitassi, Toniann; Raz, Ran (1997), "Lower bounds for cutting planes proofs with small coefficients", Journal of Symbolic Logic, 62 (3): 708–728, doi:10.2307/2275569, JSTOR 2275569, MR 1472120.
- Beame, Paul; Pitassi, Toniann (1998), "Propositional proof complexity: past, present, and future", Bulletin of the European Association for Theoretical Computer Science (65): 66–89, MR 1650939. Reprinted in Current Trends in Theoretical Computer Science, World Scientific, 2001, MR 1886033.
- Beame, Paul; Karp, Richard; Pitassi, Toniann; Saks, Michael (1998), "On the complexity of unsatisfiability proofs for random k-CNF formulas", Proceedings of the 30th ACM Symposium on Theory of Computing, pp. 561–571, doi:10.1145/276698.276870, ISBN 0-89791-962-9, MR 1715604, S2CID 10262912.
- Beame, Paul; Karp, Richard; Pitassi, Toniann; Saks, Michael (2002), "The efficiency of resolution and Davis-Putnam procedures", SIAM Journal on Computing, 31 (4): 1048–1075, doi:10.1137/S0097539700369156, MR 1919956.
- Dwork, Cynthia; Naor, Moni; Pitassi, Toniann; Rothblum, Guy N. (2010). "Differential privacy under continual observation". Proceedings of the forty-second ACM symposium on Theory of computing. pp. 715–724. doi:10.1145/1806689.1806787. ISBN 978-1-4503-0050-6. S2CID 1522154.
- Dwork, Cynthia; Hardt, Moritz; Pitassi, Toniann; Reingold, Omer; Zemel, Richard (2012). "Fairness through awareness". Proceedings of the 3rd Innovations in Theoretical Computer Science Conference. ITCS '12. New York, NY, USA: ACM. pp. 214–226. arXiv:1104.3913. doi:10.1145/2090236.2090255. ISBN 978-1-4503-1115-1. S2CID 13496699.
- Dwork, Cynthia; Feldman, Vitaly; Hardt, Moritz; Pitassi, Toniann; Reingold, Omer; Roth, Aaron (August 7, 2015). "The reusable holdout: Preserving validity in adaptive data analysis". Science. 349 (6248): 636–638. Bibcode:2015Sci...349..636D. doi:10.1126/science.aaa9375. ISSN 0036-8075. PMID 26250683.
