= DPLL =

DPLL stands for:

- DPLL algorithm, for solving the boolean satisfiability problem
- Digital phase-locked loop, an electronic feedback system that generates a signal
