= Samuel Buss =

American computer scientist and mathematician

Samuel R. Buss
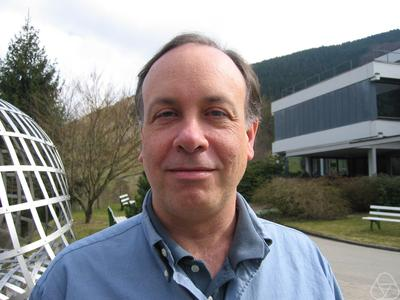
- Born: August 6, 1957 (age 69)
- Education: Princeton University; Emory University
- Known for: Bounded arithmetic Boolean formula evaluation
- Scientific career
- Fields: Computer science, mathematics
- Workplaces: University of California, Berkeley, University of California, San Diego
- Thesis: Bounded arithmetic (1985)
- Doctoral advisor: Simon Kochen
- Doctoral students: María Luisa Bonet

Samuel R. (Sam) Buss (born August 6, 1957) is an American computer scientist and mathematician who has made major contributions to the fields of mathematical logic, complexity theory and proof complexity. He is currently a professor at the University of California, San Diego, Department of Computer Science and Department of Mathematics.

== Biography ==
Buss received his bachelor's degree in 1979 from the Emory University, and his master's degree and Ph.D. from Princeton University, respectively in 1983 and 1985. He joined the University of California, Berkeley, mathematics department in 1986 as a Lecturer, and stayed there until 1988. Buss joined the faculty of University of California, San Diego, Computer Science and Mathematics Departments in 1988 as an assistant professor, where he was promoted to Professor in 1993.

In 2019, Buss gave the Gödel Lecture titled Totality, provability and feasibility.

== Research ==
Buss is considered one of the forefathers of bounded arithmetic and proof complexity.

During his PhD, Buss worked in bounded arithmetic. He received his PhD in 1985. He introduced bounded arithmetic in his thesis and gave a nice proof theoretic characterization of polynomial time computation. His thesis is one of the main references in the area of bounded arithmetic. He is also author/editor of several books in mathematical logic and computer science.

Buss proved in 1983 that the Boolean Formula Evaluation problem is in ALogTime, a major result in complexity theory.

His main research areas are mathematical logic, complexity theory and proof complexity. Other areas which he has contributed to include bounded arithmetic, bounded reverse mathematics, and lower bounds in propositional proof systems.
