= Martin Davis (mathematician) =

American mathematician (1928–2023)

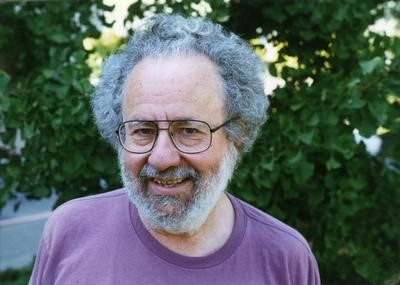
- Davis in 1996
- Born: Martin David Davis; March 8, 1928; New York City, U.S.
- Died: January 1, 2023 (aged 94); Berkeley, California, U.S.
- Education: City College of New York (AB); Princeton University (PhD)
- Known for: Davis–Putnam algorithm; DPLL algorithm; Work on Hilbert's tenth problem
- Spouse: Virginia Whiteford Palmer (m. 1951)
- Awards: Chauvenet Prize (1975)
- Scientific career
- Workplaces: Bell Labs; RAND Corporation; New York University; University of California, Berkeley
- Thesis: On the Theory of Recursive Unsolvability (1950)
- Doctoral advisor: Alonzo Church
- Doctoral students: Moshe Koppel; Donald W. Loveland; William L. Gewirtz

Martin David Davis (March 8, 1928 – January 1, 2023) was an American mathematician and computer scientist who contributed to the fields of computability theory and mathematical logic. His work on Hilbert's tenth problem led to the MRDP theorem. He also advanced the Post–Turing model and co-developed the Davis–Putnam–Logemann–Loveland (DPLL) algorithm, which is foundational for Boolean satisfiability solvers.

Davis won the Leroy P. Steele Prize, the Chauvenet Prize (with Reuben Hersh), and the Lester R. Ford Award. He was a fellow of the American Academy of Arts and Sciences and a fellow of the American Mathematical Society.

== Early life and education ==
Davis's parents were Jewish immigrants to the United States from Łódź, Poland, and married after they met again in New York City. Davis was born in New York City on March 8, 1928. He grew up in the Bronx, where his parents encouraged him to obtain a full education. He graduated from the prestigious Bronx High School of Science in 1944 and went on to receive his bachelor's degree in mathematics from City College in 1948 and his PhD from Princeton University in 1950. His doctoral dissertation, entitled On the Theory of Recursive Unsolvability, was supervised by American mathematician and computer scientist Alonzo Church.

== Academic career ==
During a research instructorship at the University of Illinois at Urbana-Champaign in the early 1950s, he joined the Control Systems Lab and became one of the early programmers of the ORDVAC. He later worked at Bell Labs and the RAND Corporation before joining New York University. During his time at the NYU, he helped set up the university's computer science department. He retired from NYU in 1996. He was later a member of visiting faculty at University of California, Berkeley.

=== Hilbert's tenth problem ===
Davis first worked on Hilbert's tenth problem during his PhD dissertation, working with Alonzo Church. The theorem, as posed by the German mathematician David Hilbert, asks a question: given a Diophantine equation, is there an algorithm that can decide if the equation is solvable? Davis's dissertation put forward a conjecture that the problem was unsolvable. In the 1950s and 1960s, Davis, along with American mathematicians Hilary Putnam and Julia Robinson, made progress toward solving this conjecture. The proof of the conjecture was finally completed in 1970 with the work of Russian mathematician Yuri Matiyasevich. This resulted in the MRDP or the DPRM theorem, named for Davis, Putnam, Robinson, and Matiyasevich. Describing the problem, Davis had earlier mentioned that he found the problem "irresistibly seductive" when he was an undergraduate and later had progressively become his "lifelong obsession".

=== Other contributions ===
Davis collaborated with Putnam, George Logemann, and Donald W. Loveland in 1961 to introduce the Davis–Putnam–Logemann–Loveland (DPLL) algorithm, which was a complete, backtracking-based search algorithm for deciding the satisfiability of propositional logic formulae in conjunctive normal form, i.e., for solving the CNF-SAT problem. The algorithm was a refinement of the earlier Davis–Putnam algorithm, which was a resolution-based procedure developed by Davis and Putnam in 1960. The algorithm is foundational in the architecture of fast Boolean satisfiability solvers.

In addition to his work on computability theory, Davis also made significant contributions to the fields of computational complexity and mathematical logic. Davis was also known for his model of Post–Turing machines.

In 1974, Davis won the Lester R. Ford Award for his expository writing related to his work on Hilbert's tenth problem, and in 1975 he won the Leroy P. Steele Prize and the Chauvenet Prize (with Reuben Hersh). He became a fellow of the American Academy of Arts and Sciences in 1982, and in 2013, he was selected as one of the inaugural fellows of the American Mathematical Society.

Davis's 1958 book Computability and Unsolvability is considered a classic in theoretical computer science, while his 2000 book The Universal Computer traces the evolution and history of computing, from Gottfried Wilhelm Leibniz to Alan Turing. His book The Undecidable, the first edition of which was published in 1965, was a collection of unsolvable problems and computable functions.

== Personal life and death ==
Davis was married to Virginia Whiteford Palmer, a textile artist. The couple met during their time in the Urbana–Champaign area and subsequently married in 1951. They had two children. The couple lived in Berkeley, California, after his retirement.

Davis died on January 1, 2023, at age 94. His wife died the same day several hours later.

== Selected publications ==
Books

- Davis, Martin (1982) [1958]. Computability and Unsolvability. New York: Dover. ISBN 0-486-61471-9. Dover reprint
- Davis, Martin (1977). Applied nonstandard analysis. New York: Wiley. ISBN 9780471198970. 2014 Dover reprint
- Davis, Martin; Weyuker, Elaine J.; Sigal, Ron (1994). Computability, complexity, and languages: fundamentals of theoretical computer science (2nd ed.). Boston: Academic Press, Harcourt, Brace. ISBN 9780122063824.
- Davis, Martin (2000). The Universal Computer: The Road from Leibniz to Turing. Norton. ISBN 0393047857. Reprinted as Engines of Logic: Mathematicians and the Origin of the Computer. New York: Norton. 2000. ISBN 9780393322293.
- Davis, Martin (2004). The Undecidable : Basic papers on undecidable propositions, unsolvable problems and computable functions. New York: Dover Publications. ISBN 0-486-43228-9. OCLC 53840050.

Articles

- Davis, Martin (1973), "Hilbert's Tenth Problem is Unsolvable", The American Mathematical Monthly, 80(3), 233–269. doi:10.1080/00029890.1973.11993265.
- Davis, Martin (1995), "Is Mathematical Insight Algorithmic?", Behavioral and Brain Sciences, 13(4), 659–60.
- Davis, Martin (2020), "Seventy Years of Computer Science", In: Blass A., Cégielski P., Dershowitz N., Droste M., Finkbeiner B. (eds.) Fields of Logic and Computation III, 105–117. Lecture Notes in Computer Science, vol. 12180. Springer: Cham, Switzerland. doi:10.1007/978-3-030-48006-6_8.

== See also ==
- Criticism of non-standard analysis
- Halting problem
- Influence of non-standard analysis
