= PV1 =

PV1 may refer to:

- 3',4'-Methylenedioxy-α-pyrrolidinopropiophenone
- Private, an enlisted rank in the US Army
- $PV_1$, the first-order version of Cook's equational theory
