= Proof procedure =

Systematic method for producing proofs

In logic, and in particular proof theory, a proof procedure for a given logic is a systematic method for producing proofs in some proof calculus of (provable) statements.

== Types of proof calculi used ==
There are several types of proof calculi. The most popular are natural deduction, sequent calculi (i.e., Gentzen-type systems), Hilbert systems, and semantic tableaux or trees. A given proof procedure will target a specific proof calculus, but can often be reformulated so as to produce proofs in other proof styles.

== Completeness ==
A proof procedure for a logic is complete if it produces a proof for each provable statement. The theorems of logical systems are typically recursively enumerable, which implies the existence of a complete but usually extremely inefficient proof procedure; however, a proof procedure is only of interest if it is reasonably efficient.

Faced with an unprovable statement, a complete proof procedure may sometimes succeed in detecting and signalling its unprovability. In the general case, where provability is only a semidecidable property, this is not possible, and instead the procedure will diverge (not terminate).

== See also ==
- Automated theorem proving
- Proof complexity
- Deductive system
