= María Luisa Bonet =

Spanish computer scientist

María Luisa Bonet Carbonell is a Spanish computer scientist interested in logic in computer science, including proof complexity and algorithms for the maximum satisfiability problem. She is a professor of computer science at the Polytechnic University of Catalonia.

== Education and career ==
Bonet is originally from Barcelona. After earning a degree in philosophy at the University of Barcelona in 1984, she became a Fulbright Fellow at the University of California, Berkeley. She earned a master's degree in mathematics there in 1987, and became a doctoral student of Samuel Buss, studying theoretical computer science. Buss moved to the University of California, San Diego in 1988, but Bonet remained at Berkeley; her 1991 doctoral dissertation, The Lengths of Propositional Proofs and the Deduction Rule, listed both Buss and Leo Harrington as co-advisors.

Bonet did postdoctoral research as a Warchawski Assistant Professor at the University of California, San Diego, at the University of Pennsylvania, and at DIMACS in New Jersey. She returned to Barcelona in 1996, to take a position in the computer science department of the Polytechnic University of Catalonia. She became a full professor there in 2007.

== Selected publications ==
- Bonet, María Luisa; Pitassi, Toniann; Raz, Ran (1997), "Lower bounds for cutting planes proofs with small coefficients" (PDF), Journal of Symbolic Logic, 62 (3): 708–728, doi:10.2307/2275569, JSTOR 2275569, MR 1472120; preliminary version in 27th Symposium on Theory of Computing (STOC 1995), doi:10.1145/225058.225275
- Bonet, María Luisa; Pitassi, Toniann; Raz, Ran (2000), "On interpolation and automatization for Frege systems" (PDF), SIAM Journal on Computing, 29 (6): 1939–1967, doi:10.1137/S0097539798353230, MR 1756400
- Bonet, María Luisa; Esteban, Juan Luis; Galesi, Nicola; Johannsen, Jan (2000), "On the relative complexity of resolution refinements and cutting planes proof systems" (PDF), SIAM Journal on Computing, 30 (5): 1462–1484, doi:10.1137/S0097539799352474, MR 1813959
- Bonet, María Luisa; Levy, Jordi; Manyà, Felip (2007), "Resolution for Max-SAT", Artificial Intelligence, 171 (8–9): 606–618, doi:10.1016/j.artint.2007.03.001, MR 2333554
- Ansótegui, Carlos; Bonet, María Luisa; Levy, Jordi (2013), "SAT-based MaxSAT algorithms", Artificial Intelligence, 196: 77–105, doi:10.1016/j.artint.2013.01.002, MR 3024193; based on conference papers in SAT 2009, CCIA 2009, AAAI 2010, and CP 2012
