= Chaff (newspaper) =

Students' newspaper at Massey University, New Zealand

Chaff was the students' newspaper at Massey University, New Zealand, from 1934 until 2011.

== History ==
Chaff was established by the Massey Agricultural College Students' Association. After Massey gained university status in 1964, Chaff became the newspaper of the Massey University Students' Association. After the university established new campuses in Albany and Wellington in the 1990s, Chaff remained the newspaper of students on the original Manawatū campus in Palmerston North, while new publications were established for the new campuses. The newspaper ceased publication after the New Zealand Parliament passed a law making membership of student associations voluntary, which made them more dependent on funding from their universities, although it had been losing money and was considering cutbacks before this. In 2012, a university-wide student publication, Massive, was launched, replacing Chaff, Wellington's Magneto and Albany's Satellite.

Early issues of the newspaper were typewritten through carbon paper on to A4 paper, with drawn illustrations, and were sold for three pence. The first issue was published, without a title, on 16 March 1934. The second issue was published on 28 March 1934 and was the first to carry the Chaff masthead. During World War II, it was published intermittently and a war edition was published under the title The Horse's Neck from 1943 to 1944. Starting in the 1950s, the newspaper was produced more often, in an expanded format. Tom Scott drew cartoons and covers and wrote occasional articles for the newspaper between 1966 and 1971. During this time, the newspaper often provoked controversy by targeting people in positions of authority. On one occasion, Scott was threatened with a charge of blasphemous libel. On the occasion of being granted an honorary doctorate by Massey in 2002, Scott was reported as saying: "It was here that I became a writer and a cartoonist. I left with a de facto degree in journalism-cartooning".

According to Michael Belgrave's history of Massey, from the late 1960s to the early 1980s, Chaff was "the mouthpiece for most of the left-wing criticism" at Massey of the New Zealand government. The newspaper also published "highly laudatory commentary on the Chinese Cultural Revolution". In his PhD thesis on the construction and propagation of positive images of China in New Zealand, Alistair Shaw notes that Neil Rennie, a staff writer for NZ Farmer, returned from a student tour of China in 1974 and wrote a series of articles for the farming publication about the country, but also one for Chaff. Shaw argues that "virtually all student accounts from the 1974 tour contained a New Zealand 'tail'. After enthusing about what they saw in the PRC, a deprecating comment about New Zealand would follow", citing Rennie's Chaff article, titled 'Mao's China: Impressions', as an example of this. Allan Cumming, the editor in 1976, was peripherally involved in the Palmerston North anarchist group Impulse, which produced a fold-out for the newspaper introducing readers to anarchism in 1977.

In the early 1990s, when the New Zealand Minister of Education, Alexander Lockwood Smith, was introducing student loans and significant changes to the funding of universities, most issues of Chaff "had at least one article or bordering-on-defamatory cartoon about the Right Honourable Lockwood Smith", according to William Muirhead, who later edited Chaff and was commissioned by the university to publish a history of the newspaper.

By its final year, 2011, 3,000 copies of Chaff were being printed each week. A history of the newspaper commissioned by the university library, The Wheat from the Chaff: Almost 80 Years as Seen Through the Pages of Massey's Student Newspaper, was published in 2014. Massey University Students' Association complained that it owned content such as cartoons and other extracts from the newspaper that were reproduced in the book and that it was not consulted by the university prior to its publication. The association was reported to be seeking legal advice. In response, a spokesperson for the university stated that the head of the university's library services had spoken to the then student president at the end of 2012 about plans for the book, and that "there was no objection so we proceeded on that basis, because this was going to be a good thing". Despite the row, the association's president spoke at the book's launch at Massey.

== Mao Zedong controversy ==
In May 2006, the cover of the newspaper featured an image of Mao Zedong superimposed on a woman's body, under the title Commupolitan, in an apparent spoof of Cosmopolitan. This prompted protest by approximately 50 students, most of whom were Chinese, and the resulting controversy received media attention. Some Chinese students argued that the cover was racist, drew parallels with Jyllands-Posten's publication of cartoons of Muhammad the previous year, and also warned that students from China spent significant amounts of money in New Zealand. According to academics Roger Openshaw and Elizabeth Rata, the latter argument implied that this spending might be at risk because of the controversy. Some protestors likened the image to mocking Jesus.

A member of the university administration, Bruce Graham, argued that the newspaper had shown a lack of respect and that the cover was in extremely poor taste, but accepted that the magazine had editorial independence. The editors came under pressure, including from New Zealand Race Relations Commissioner Joris De Bres, who argued that student media needed to act more responsibly, stating: "Asian people are amongst those who face the most discrimination in New Zealand. Student media should be careful they don't unwittingly add to this alienation, even if they have seemingly innocuous or satirical motives". However, the editors refused to apologise.

In an open letter to the newspaper's readers, the Chaff editorial team wrote that they had met with Chinese students, that they acknowledged "the offence and anxiety that has come as a consequence of our last cover" and understood "that the figure of Mao is central to Chinese nationalism, and that an attack on Mao would be viewed by some Chinese as an attack on all Chinese people". They wrote, however, that "we will not apologise for our Mao cover", noting that they had also received letters of support and that "it is evident that the Chinese community does not hold one single opinion on the matter". According to Chaff's news editor, the publication "received hundreds of emails both condemning and supporting their decision" to run the front page. He argued that the cover made a political rather than racial statement, and that "We believe that a significant amount of the offence caused by the cover is due to confusion over this fact...Satire is a way to get someone to view the world from a different perspective, and the ability to view the world from alternative perspectives is central to any free society".

Reacting to the incident, Dong Li, a senior lecturer in Chinese language, society and literature at Massey who left China in the 1980s, told the Manawatū Standard that students from China had been brainwashed by their government and that "Mao is depicted as a genius. He was a genius – an evil genius, like Hitler. Seventy million people died because of his cruel and stupid rule". Li argued that "When you are here in this Western democracy, you should not study only science, economics and finance. I welcome their presence here, but I advise them to take advantage of opportunities to learn the truth about modern China". Another Chinese staff member, finance lecturer Fei Wu, defended the protesting students, saying that Mao was "a cultural icon and we want to protect that".
