= George Logemann =

American mathematician

George Wahl Logemann
- Born: January 31, 1938; Milwaukee, Wisconsin, U.S.
- Died: June 5, 2012 (aged 74); Hartford, Connecticut, U.S.
- Education: New York University
- Known for: DPLL algorithm
- Partner: Bernice C. Schaefer
- Scientific career
- Fields: Computer science
- Thesis: Existence and Uniqueness of Rarefaction Waves (1965)
- Doctoral advisors: Peter David Lax, Robert Davis Richtmyer

George Wahl Logemann (31 January 1938, Milwaukee, – 5 June 2012, Hartford) was an American mathematician and computer scientist. He became well known for the Davis–Putnam–Logemann–Loveland algorithm to solve Boolean satisfiability problems. He also contributed to the field of computer music.
