= LJ =

LJ may refer to:

== Arts and media ==
- L. J. Burrows, a fictional character on the TV series Prison Break
- Lemon Jelly, a British electronica duo
- Library Journal, an American trade publication for librarians
- Linux Journal, an American monthly technology magazine
- LiveJournal, a Russian social networking service

== Businesses and organizations ==
- LJ Air, a Chinese airline
- Jin Air, a South Korean airline (IATA code LJ)
- Lashkar i Jhangvi, a Muslim terrorist organization

== People ==
=== In arts and media ===
==== Writing and journalism ====
- L. J. Davis (1940–2011), American writer
- L. J. Greenberg (1861–1931), British journalist
- L. J. K. Setright (1931–2005), English journalist
- L. J. Smith (author) (born 1965), American author

==== Other arts ====
- L. J. Foret (1930–2002), American musician
- LJ Reyes (born 1987), Filipino actress
- L. J. Roberts (born 1980), American textile artist

=== In government and politics ===
- L. J. C. Daniels (1858–1949), American political activist
- L. J. Fellenz (1882–1941), American politician
- L. J. Forman (1855–1933), American politician
- L. J. Maxwell (1851–??), American politician
- L. J. Seneviratne (1899–??), Sri Lankan civil servant

=== In sports ===
==== Basketball ====
- L.J. Cason (born 2006), American basketball player
- L. J. Cooke (1868–1943), American basketball coach
- LJ Cryer (born 2001), American basketball player
- L. J. Figueroa (born 1998), Dominican-American basketball player
- L. J. Hepp (born 1978), American basketball coach
- L. J. Peak (born 1996), American basketball player
- Larry Johnson (basketball, born 1969), American basketball player

==== American football ====
- L. J. Castile (born 1987), American football player
- L. J. Collier (born 1995), American football player
- L. J. Fort (born 1990), American football player
- LJ Martin, American football player
- L. J. McCray (born 1991), American football player
- L.J. McCray (defensive lineman) (born 2005), American football player
- L. J. Phillips (born 2004), American football player
- L. J. Shelton (born 1976), American football player
- L. J. Smith (born 1980), American football player
- Lawrence Jackson (born 1985), American football player

==== Other sports ====
- L. J. Hoes (born 1990), American baseball player
- L. J. Mazzilli (born 1990), American baseball player
- L. J. van Zyl (born 1985), South African athlete

=== In other fields ===
- L. J. F. Brimble (1904–1965), English botanist
- L. J. Hanifan (1879–1932), American economist
- L. J. Jenkins (born 1987), American cowboy
- L. J. Sevin (1930–2015), American venture capitalist

== Places ==
- La Jolla, San Diego, California
- La Jolla, Placentia, California
- Ljubljana, the capital of Slovenia

== Science and technology ==
- System LJ, Gentzen's sequent calculus for intuitionist logic
- LaserJet, a printer brand name
- Lennard-Jones potential, a function used in chemical physics
- Lightweight Java, a programming language

== Other uses ==
- "Long jump" athletics abbreviation in track and field
- ǈ (digraph), a digraph used in some Slavic languages
- Lord Justice of Appeal, a type of judge in England and Wales

== See also ==
- Lje, a letter of the Cyrillic script
- Ljay, a given name
