= Carew Arthur Meredith =

Irish mathematician (1904–1976)

C. A. Meredith
- Born: 28 June 1904; Dublin, Ireland
- Died: 31 March 1976 (aged 71); Dublin, Ireland
- Education: Trinity College, Cambridge
- Known for: condensed detachment
- Scientific career
- Fields: Logic, Mathematics
- Workplaces: Trinity College Dublin

Carew Arthur Meredith (28 July 1904 – 31 March 1976), usually cited as C. A. Meredith, was an influential Irish logician, who worked in Trinity College Dublin from 1943 to 1964. His work on condensed detachment (inspired by the work of Łukasiewicz) is influential in modern research.

== Biography ==
Born 28 July 1904 into a distinguished Dublin family, he was the son of barrister Arthur Francis Carew Meredith K.C., whose opinions were sought by Éamon de Valera in drafting the constitution of the Irish Republic (1919–22). Educated in England at Winchester College, he went on to read mathematics at Trinity College, Cambridge, in 1922 becoming the first mathematical student to take a double first and 'B star' in two years. He worked in England until 1939 as a private tutor for university students, when he moved to Ireland, as he was a committed pacifist. In 1943 he became a lecturer in mathematics in Trinity College Dublin.

Łukasiewicz was appointed professor at the Royal Irish Academy, where he lectured on mathematical logic. Meredith attended these lectures from 1947 on, and became keenly interested in the Lukasiewicz's detachment operation, for which—as he himself once phrased it—he "seemed to have some aptitude."

Meredith was the cousin of David Meredith. He was also related to another mathematician, Thomas Meredith. He was a nephew of Richard Edmund Meredith and a cousin of Monk Gibbon, Judge James Creed Meredith and Ralph Creed Meredith. His old school friend from Winchester, William Empson, described him as "a small, gnomelike figure with a grin like a Cheshire cat and a pronounced Dublin accent (good for reading aloud from Joyce)".

He did logic whenever time and opportunity presented themselves, and he did it on whatever materials came to hand: in a pub, his favored pint of porter within reach, he would use the inside of cigarette packs to write proofs for logical colleagues.

== Work ==
He proved the shortest known axiomatic bases for a number of logic systems, such as this one-axiom basis for propositional calculus:

$( ( ( ( \varphi \to \psi ) \to ( \neg \chi \to \neg \theta ) ) \to \chi ) \to \tau ) \to ( ( \tau \to \varphi ) \to ( \theta \to \varphi ) )$

His achievements in that area were unsurpassed until automated theorem provers in the last few years, which build on his work, proved some shorter ones for some systems and proved his shortest for others. Notably, Stephen Wolfram, William McCune and others built on Meredith's work to produce the shortest known single axiom equivalent to the axioms of propositional calculus.

== Selected publications ==
- C.A. Meredith (1953). "Single axioms for the systems (C,N), (C,0), and (A,N) of the two-valued propositional calculus". Journal of Computing Systems. 1: 155–164.
- E.J. Lemmon and C.A. Meredith and D. Meredith and A.N. Prior and I. Thomas (1957). Calculi of pure strict implication (Technical Report). Canterbury University College, Christchurch. (Reprinted in Philosophical Logic, Reidel, 1970 doi:10.1007/978-94-010-9614-0_17)
- C. Meredith and A. Prior (1963). "Notes on the axiomatics of the propositional calculus". Notre Dame Journal of Formal Logic. 4 (3): 171–187. doi:10.1305/ndjfl/1093957574.
- C.A. Meredith and A.N. Prior (1968). "Equational logic". Notre Dame Journal of Formal Logic. 9 (3): 212–226. doi:10.1305/ndjfl/1093893457.
