= Paradox (theorem prover) =

Finite-domain model finder for pure first-order logic with equality

- Original author(s): Koen Lindström Claessen; Niklas Sörensson
- Developer(s): Chalmers University of Technology
- Initial release: 2003; 22 years ago
- Final release: 4 / 2011; 14 years ago
- Written in: Haskell
- Available in: English
- Type: Automated theorem proving
- License: GNU General Public License

Paradox is a finite-domain model finder for pure first-order logic (FOL) with equality developed by Koen Lindström Claessen and Niklas Sörensson at the Chalmers University of Technology. It can a participate as part of an automated theorem proving system. The software is written mostly in the programming language Haskell. It is free and open-source software released under the terms of the GNU General Public License.

== Features ==
The Paradox developers described the software as a Models And Counter-Examples (Mace) style method after the McCune's tool of that name. The Paradox introduced new techniques which help to reduce the computational complexity of the model search problem:

- term definitions – new variable reduction method
- incremental satisfiability checker – works with small domains first, then gradually increases the domain size, reusing information gained from prior failed searches
- static symmetry reduction – adds extra constraints
- sort inference – works with unsorted problems

Paradox was developed up to version 4, the final version being effective in model finding for Web Ontology Language OWL2.

== Competition ==
Paradox was a division winner in the annual CADE ATP System Competition, an annual contest for automated theorem proving, in the years 2003 to 2012.
