= TPTP =

TPTP is an abbreviation and may refer to

- Thousands of Problems for Theorem Provers
- Test & Performance Tools Platform, a platform of Eclipse
