= Robbins algebra =

In abstract algebra, a Robbins algebra is an algebra containing a single binary operation $\lor$ and a single unary operation $\neg$ that satisfy the following axioms:

For all elements a, b, and c:

1. Associativity: $a \lor \left(b \lor c \right) = \left(a \lor b \right) \lor c$
2. Commutativity: $a \lor b = b \lor a$
3. Robbins equation: $\neg \left( \neg \left(a \lor b \right) \lor \neg \left(a \lor \neg b \right) \right) = a$

For many years, it was conjectured, but unproven, that all Robbins algebras are Boolean algebras. This was proved by William McCune in 1997, so the term "Robbins algebra" is now simply a synonym for "Boolean algebra".

== History ==
In 1933, Edward Huntington proposed a new set of axioms for Boolean algebras, consisting of (1) and (2) above, plus:

- Huntington's equation: $\neg(\neg a \lor b) \lor \neg(\neg a \lor \neg b) = a.$

From these axioms, Huntington derived the usual axioms of Boolean algebra.

Very soon thereafter, Herbert Robbins posed the Robbins conjecture, namely that the Huntington equation could be replaced with what came to be called the Robbins equation, and the result would still be Boolean algebra. $\lor$ would interpret Boolean join and $\neg$ Boolean complement. Boolean meet and the constants 0 and 1 are easily defined from the Robbins algebra primitives. Pending verification of the conjecture, the system of Robbins was called "Robbins algebra".

Verifying the Robbins conjecture required proving Huntington's equation, or some other axiomatization of a Boolean algebra, as theorems of a Robbins algebra. Huntington, Robbins, Alfred Tarski, and others worked on the problem, but failed to find a proof or counterexample.

=== McCune's proof ===
In 1996, William McCune proved the conjecture using the automated theorem prover EQP (equational prover). EQP was developed by McCune while working at the Mathematics and Computer Science Division of the Argonne National Laboratory. McCune considered EQP a prototype which he developed specifically to prove the Robbins conjecture, unlike OTTER, another theorem prover which he developed for general use. The proof took eight days to be completed by EQP. McCune later called Robbins, then 81 years old, to tell him that the conjecture had been proved.

McCune's proof built on prior work on the conjecture by Steve Winker, also a researcher at Argonne.

For a complete proof of the Robbins conjecture in one consistent notation and following McCune closely, see Mann (2003). Dahn (1998) simplified McCune's machine proof.

== See also ==
- Algebraic structure
- Minimal axioms for Boolean algebra
