= Branden Fitelson =

American philosopher (born 1969)

- Born: August 17, 1969 (age 57); Syracuse, New York, U.S.
- Awards: Mellon Research Grant; WARF Fellowship

Education
- Education: University of Wisconsin–Madison
- Thesis: Studies in Bayesian confirmation theory (2001)
- Doctoral advisor: Malcolm Forster

Philosophical work
- Era: Contemporary philosophy
- Region: Western philosophy
- School: Analytic
- Institutions: Stanford University; LMU Munich; Northeastern University
- Doctoral students: Kenny Easwaran
- Main interests: Formal epistemology, metaphysics (object theory), logic, philosophy of science
- Notable ideas: Computational metaphysics

Branden Fitelson (/ˈfaɪtəlsən/; born August 17, 1969) is an American philosopher and Distinguished Professor of Philosophy at Northeastern University.

He is known for his expertise in formal epistemology and philosophy of science.

== Articles ==
- Edward N. Zalta and Branden Fitelson, "Steps Toward a Computational Metaphysics", Journal of Philosophical Logic 36(2) (April 2007): 227–247. [The article reviews the second-order axiomatic theory of abstract objects and shows how to represent a fragment of it in Prover9's first-order syntax.]

== See also ==
- Evolutionary argument against naturalism
- Minimal axioms for Boolean algebra
