= Minimal axioms for Boolean algebra =

Mathematical assumptions

In mathematical logic, minimal axioms for Boolean algebra are assumptions which are equivalent to the axioms of Boolean algebra (or propositional calculus), chosen to be as short as possible. For example, an axiom with six NAND operations and three variables is equivalent to Boolean algebra:

$$((a\mid b)\mid c) \mid (a\mid((a\mid c)\mid a)) = c$$

where the vertical bar represents the NAND logical operation (also known as the Sheffer stroke).

It is one of 25 candidate axioms for this property identified by Stephen Wolfram, by enumerating the Sheffer identities of length less or equal to 15 elements (excluding mirror images) that have no noncommutative models with four or fewer variables, and was first proven equivalent by William McCune, Branden Fitelson, and Larry Wos. MathWorld, a site associated with Wolfram, has named the axiom the "Wolfram axiom". McCune et al. also found a longer single axiom for Boolean algebra based on disjunction and negation.

In 1933, Edward Vermilye Huntington identified the axiom

$${\neg({\neg x} \lor {y})} \lor {\neg({\neg x} \lor {\neg y})} = x$$

as being equivalent to Boolean algebra, when combined with the commutativity of the OR operation, $x \lor y = y \lor x$, associativity, $(x \lor y) \lor z = x \lor (y \lor z)$, and the assumption of idempotence, $(x \lor x) = x$, the latter shown to be redundant in a correction. Herbert Robbins conjectured that Huntington's axiom could be replaced by

$$\neg(\neg(x \lor y) \lor \neg(x \lor {\neg y})) = x,$$

which requires one fewer use of the logical negation operator $\neg$. Neither Robbins nor Huntington could prove this conjecture; nor could Alfred Tarski, who took considerable interest in it later. The conjecture was eventually proved in 1996 with the aid of theorem-proving software. This proof established that the Robbins axiom, together with associativity and commutativity, form a 3-basis for Boolean algebra. The existence of a 2-basis was established in 1967 by Carew Arthur Meredith:

$$\neg({\neg x} \lor y) \lor x = x,$$
$$\neg({\neg x} \lor y) \lor (z \lor y) = y \lor (z \lor x).$$

The following year, Meredith found a 2-basis in terms of the Sheffer stroke:

$$(x\mid x) \mid (y\mid x) = x,$$
$$x|(y\mid(x\mid z)) = ((z\mid y)\mid y)\mid x.$$

In 1973, Padmanabhan and Quackenbush demonstrated a method that, in principle, would yield a 1-basis for Boolean algebra. Applying this method in a straightforward manner yielded "axioms of enormous length", thereby prompting the question of how shorter axioms might be found. This search yielded the 1-basis in terms of the Sheffer stroke given above, as well as the 1-basis

$$\neg(\neg(\neg(x \lor y) \lor z) \lor \neg(x \lor \neg(\neg z \lor \neg(z \lor u)))) = z,$$

which is written in terms of OR and NOT.
