= Owen Astrachan =

American computer scientist

Owen Astrachan is an American computer scientist and professor of the practice of computer science at Duke University, where he is also the department's director of undergraduate studies. He is known for his work in curriculum development and methods of teaching computer science. He was one of the first National Science Foundation CISE Distinguished Education Fellows, and is a recipient of the ACM Outstanding Educator Award. He was the principal investigator on the multi-year NSF/College Board project that led to the release of the AP Computer Science Principles course and exam.

== Early life ==
Astrachan was born in New York City in 1956 to Gail Lovejoy and Anthony Astrachan. He has a younger brother, Joshua Astrachan.

== Education and early career ==
Astrachan graduated from Dartmouth College in 1978 with an AB degree in mathematics. He received a Master of Arts in Teaching from Duke in 1979, doing his initial teaching at Camp Lejeune High School, Camp Lejeune, North Carolina.

From 1980 to 1985 he taught math and computer science at Durham Academy in Durham, North Carolina. During the summer of 1983 he attended a summer program for high school teachers at Carnegie Mellon University preparing to teach the new College Board AP Computer Science course. He joined the development team for the new exam.

In 1985 Astrachan began graduate studies in computer science at Duke. His thesis work was with Donald W. Loveland on automated theorem proving using model elimination. His teaching responsibilities included curricular development for the first computer science course for majors and the introductory computer science course for non-majors. He spent the summer of 1991 as a research assistant at SRI International in Menlo Park, California working on automated theorem proving with Mark E. Stickel. He received his MS from Duke in 1989 and his PhD in 1992.

While a student in 1989 he became the Chief Reader for the AP Computer Science test with the Educational Testing Service, a position he held until 1994. For four years, from 1990 to 1993, he and other graduate students ran the first distributed, internet-based programming contest. It was inspired by the ACM International Collegiate Programming Contest but open to a wider range of students and required no travel, only access to email.

== Computer science education and curriculum development ==
In 1993 Astrachan joined the Duke faculty in the department of computer science as assistant professor of the practice of computer science. That fall he became the director of undergraduate studies. He changed the introductory computer science course to use C++ as the programming language and began writing an introductory textbook. The first edition of A Computer Science Tapestry: Exploring Programming and Computer Science with C++ was published in 1997 and was widely used. The second edition was published in 2000.

Astrachan continued his work with the AP Computer Science Development Committee. He was part of the team developing the AP Computer Science AB and became the chief reader on that exam. Later he was a leader in the change of programming language from Pascal to C++ and again from C++ to Java. In 2007, he and Peter J. Denning were named NSF Computer and Information Science and Engineering Distinguished Education Fellows for "their outstanding efforts to revitalize undergraduate computing education in the United States."

In 2008 Astrachan became the principal investigator for the joint NSF/College Board project to develop a new Advanced Placement (AP) course, AP Computer Science Principles and the continuing grant to complete the development of the AP CSP exam. The new course was designed to broaden participation in computing. The first courses began in Fall 2016 and the first exam was given in May 2017. Over 50,000 students took the exam, setting a record for the largest initial AP exam participation.

In 2016 the Association for Computing Machinery (ACM) awarded Astrachan its Karl V. Karlstrom Outstanding Educator Award for "three decades of innovative computer science pedagogy and inspirational community leadership in broadening the appeal of high school and introductory-level college computer science courses." The citation ended by quoting "Astrachan's Law" as an example of his approach to teaching: "never ask a student to use a computer to solve a problem that is more easily solved without it."

== Personal life ==
Astrachan is married to Laura Heyneman and has two children.

== Awards ==
- 2002: Richard K. Lublin Teaching Award at Duke University
- 2007: NSF CISE Distinguished Education Fellow
- 2013: ACM Distinguished Member
- 2016: ACM Karl V. Karlstrom Outstanding Educator Award

== See also ==
- AP Computer Science Principles
- List of pioneers in computer science
- Google LLC v. Oracle America, Inc.
- Bubble Sort
- 1024 (number)
- Duke University
