= Astrachan (surname) =

Astrachan is a surname. Notable people with the surname include:

- Joshua Astrachan, American film producer
- Owen Astrachan, American computer scientist
