= LowerUnivalents =

Proof compression algorithm

In proof compression, an area of mathematical logic, LowerUnivalents is an algorithm used for the compression of propositional resolution proofs. LowerUnivalents is a generalised algorithm of the LowerUnits, and it is able to lower not only units but also subproofs of non-unit clauses, provided that they satisfy some additional conditions.
