= Resolution proof compression by splitting =

In mathematical logic, proof compression by splitting is an algorithm that operates as a post-process on resolution proofs. It was proposed by Scott Cotton in his paper "Two Techniques for Minimizing Resolution Proof".

The Splitting algorithm is based on the following observation:

Given a proof of unsatisfiability $\pi$ and a variable $x$, it is easy to re-arrange (split) the proof in a proof of $x$ and a proof of $\neg x$ and the recombination of these two proofs (by an additional resolution step) may result in a proof smaller than the original.

Note that applying Splitting in a proof $\pi$ using a variable $x$ does not invalidates a latter application of the algorithm using a differente variable $y$. Actually, the method proposed by Cotton generates a sequence of proofs $\pi_1 \pi_2 \ldots$, where each proof $\pi_{i+1}$ is the result of applying Splitting to $\pi_i$. During the construction of the sequence, if a proof $\pi_j$ happens to be too large, $\pi_{j+1}$ is set to be the smallest proof in $\{\pi_1, \pi_2, \ldots, \pi_j\}$.

For achieving a better compression/time ratio, a heuristic for variable selection is desirable. For this purpose, Cotton defines the "additivity" of a resolution step (with antecedents $p$ and $n$ and resolvent $r$):

$$\operatorname{add}(r) := \max(|r|-\max(|p|, |n|), 0)$$

Then, for each variable $v$, a score is calculated summing the additivity of all the resolution steps in $\pi$ with pivot $v$ together with the number of these resolution steps. Denoting each score calculated this way by $add(v, \pi)$, each variable is selected with a probability proportional to its score:

$$p(v) = \frac{\operatorname{add}(v, \pi_i)}{\sum_x{\operatorname{add}(x, \pi_i)}}$$

To split a proof of unsatisfiability $\pi$ in a proof $\pi_x$ of $x$ and a proof $\pi_{\neg x}$ of $\neg x$, Cotton proposes the following:

Let $l$ denote a literal and $p \oplus _x n$ denote the resolvent of clauses $p$ and $n$ where $x \in p$ and $\neg x \in n$. Then, define the map $\pi_l$ on nodes in the resolution dag of $\pi$:

$$\pi_l(c) := \begin{cases}
c, & \text{if } c \text{ is an input}  \\
\pi_l(p),  & \text{if } c = p \oplus_x n \text{ and } (l = x \text{ or } x \notin \pi_l(p)) \\
\pi_l(n),  & \text{if } c = p \oplus_x n \text{ and } (l = \neg x \mbox{ or } \neg x \notin \pi_l(n)) \\
\pi_l(p) \oplus_x \pi_l(p),  & \text{if } x \in \pi_l(p) \text{ and } \neg x \in \pi_l(n)
\end{cases}$$

Also, let $o$ be the empty clause in $\pi$. Then, $\pi_x$ and $\pi_{\neg x}$ are obtained by computing $\pi_x(o)$ and $\pi_{\neg x}(o)$, respectively.
