= Suggested Upper Merged Ontology =

Type of upper ontology for computer systems

Suggested Upper Merged Ontology

- Entity
  - Physical
    - Object
    - Process
  - Abstract
    - Quantity
    - Proposition
    - Attribute
    - Relation
    - Set or Class

Fundamental categories in the Suggested Upper Merged Ontology

The Suggested Upper Merged Ontology (SUMO) is an upper ontology intended as a foundation ontology for a variety of computer information processing systems. SUMO defines a hierarchy of classes and related rules and relationships. These are expressed in a version of the language SUO-KIF, a higher-order logic that has a LISP-like syntax, as well as the TPTP family of languages. A mapping from WordNet synsets to SUMO has been defined. Initially, SUMO was focused on meta-level concepts (general entities that do not belong to a specific problem domain), and thereby would lead naturally to a categorization scheme for encyclopedias. It has now been considerably expanded to include a mid-level ontology and dozens of domain ontologies.

SUMO is organized for interoperability of automated reasoning engines. To maximize compatibility, schema designers can try to assure that their naming conventions use the same meanings as SUMO for identical words (for example, "agent" or "process"). SUMO has an associated open source Sigma knowledge engineering environment.

Initially, Sumo was developed by the Teknowledge Corporation and now is maintained by Articulate Software. SUMO is open source. The first release was in December 2000.

== See also ==
- Semantic translation
