= Ned Hill (politician) =

African-American legislator

Ned Hill was a state legislator in Arkansas. He was a member of the Arkansas House of Representatives. He was "colored". He was elected in 1874. He represented Jefferson County, Arkansas along with L. J. Maxwell and L. B. Boston.

== See also ==
- African American officeholders from the end of the Civil War until before 1900
- L. J. Maxwell
