= Model elimination =

Model elimination is the name attached to a pair of proof procedures invented by Donald W. Loveland, the first of which was published in 1968 in the Journal of the ACM. Their primary purpose is to carry out automated theorem proving, though they can readily be extended to logic programming, including the more general disjunctive logic programming.

Model elimination is closely related to resolution while also bearing characteristics of a tableaux method. It is a progenitor of the SLD resolution procedure used in the Prolog logic programming language.

While somewhat eclipsed by attention to, and progress in, resolution theorem provers, model elimination has continued to attract the attention of researchers and software developers. Today there are several theorem provers under active development that are based on the model elimination procedure.
