= CARINE =

CARINE (Computer Aided Reasoning Engine) is a first-order classical logic automated theorem prover. It was initially built for the study of the enhancement effects of the strategies delayed clause-construction (DCC) and attribute sequences (ATS) in a depth-first search based algorithm. CARINE's main search algorithm is semi-linear resolution (SLR) which is based on an iteratively-deepening depth-first search (also known as depth-first iterative-deepening (DFID)) and used in theorem provers like THEO. SLR employs DCC to achieve a high inference rate, and ATS to reduce the search space.

== Delayed Clause Construction (DCC) ==
Delayed Clause Construction is a stalling strategy that enhances a theorem prover's performance by reducing the work to construct clauses to a minimum. Instead of constructing every conclusion (clause) of an applied inference rule, the information to construct such clause is temporarily stored until the theorem prover decides to either discard the clause or construct it. If the theorem prover decides to keep the clause, it will be constructed and stored in memory, otherwise the information to construct the clause is erased. Storing the information from which an inferred clause can be constructed require almost no additional CPU operations. However, constructing a clause may consume a lot of time. Some theorem provers spend 30%–40% of their total execution time constructing and deleting clauses. With DCC this wasted time can be salvaged.

DCC is useful when too many intermediate clauses (especially first-order clauses) are being constructed and discarded in a short period of time because the operations performed to construct such short lived clauses are avoided. DCC may not be very effective on theorems with only propositional clauses.

=== How does DCC work? ===
After every application of an inference rule, certain variables may have to be substituted by terms (e.g. x → f(a)) and thus a substitution set is formed. Instead of constructing the resulting clause and discarding the substitution set, the theorem prover simply maintains the substitution set along with some other information, like what clauses where involved in the inference rule and what inference rule was applied, and continues the derivation without constructing the resulting clause of the inference rule. This procedure keeps going along a derivation until the theorem provers reaches a point where it decides, based on certain criteria and heuristics, whether to construct the final clause in the derivation (and probably some other clause(s) along the path) or discard the whole derivation i.e., deletes from memory the maintained substitution sets and whatever information stored with them.

== Attribute sequences (ATS) ==
(An informal definition of) a clause in theorem proving is a statement that can result in a true or false answer depending on the evaluation of its literals. A clause is represented as a disjunction (i.e., OR), conjunction (i.e., AND), set, or multi-set (similar to a set but can contain identical elements) of literals.

An example of a clause as a disjunction of literals is:
$$\lnot \operatorname{wealthy}(Y) \lor \lnot \operatorname{smart}(Y) \lor \lnot \operatorname{beautiful}(Y) \lor \operatorname{loves}(X, Y)$$
where the symbols $\lor$ and $\lnot$ are, respectively, logical or and logical not.

The above example states that if Y is wealthy AND smart AND beautiful then X loves Y. It does not say who X and Y are though. Note that the above representation comes from the logical statement:

For all Y, X belonging to the domain of human beings:
$$\operatorname{wealthy}(Y) \land \operatorname{smart}(Y) \land \operatorname{beautiful}(Y) \implies \operatorname{loves}(X,Y)$$

By using some transformation rules of formal logic we produce the disjunction of literals of the example given above.

X and Y are variables. $\lnot$wealthy, $\lnot$smart, $\lnot$beautiful, loves are literals. Suppose we substitute the variable X for the constant John and the variable Y for the constant Jane then the above clause will become:

$$\lnot \operatorname{wealthy}(\text{Jane}) \lor \lnot \operatorname{smart}(\text{Jane}) \lor \lnot \operatorname{beautiful}(\text{Jane}) \lor \operatorname{loves}(\text{John},\text{Jane})$$

A clause attribute is a characteristic of a clause. Some examples of clause attributes are:

- the number of literals in a clause (i.e., clause length)
- the number of term symbols in a clause
- the number of constants in a clause
- the number of variables in a clause
- the number of functions in a clause
- the number of negative literals in a clause
- the number of positive literals in a clause
- the number of distinct variables in a clause
- the maximum depth of any term in all the literals in a clause

Example

the clause
$$C = \lnot P(x) \lor Q(a,b,f(x))$$
has:

- a length of 2 because it contains two literals
  - one negative literal which is $\lnot P(x)$
  - one positive literal which is Q(a,b,f(x))
- two constants which are a and b
- two variables (x occurs twice)
- one distinct variable which is x
- one function which is f
- maximum term depth of 2
- five term symbols which are x, a, b, f, x

An attribute sequence is a sequence of k n-tuples of clause attributes that represent a projection of a set of derivations of length k. k and n are strictly positive integers. The set of derivations form the domain and the attribute sequences form the codomain of the mapping between derivations and attribute sequences.

Example

<(2,2),(2,1),(1,1)> is an attribute sequence where k = 3 and n = 2.

It corresponds to some derivation, say, <(B1,B2),(R1,B3),(R2,B4)> where B1, B2, R1, B3, R2, and B4 are clauses. The attribute here is assumed to be the length of a clause.

The first pair (2,2) corresponds to the pair (B1,B2) from the derivation. It indicates that the length of B1 is 2 and the length of B2 is also 2.

The second pair (2,1) corresponds to the pair (R1,B3) and it indicates that the length of R1 is 2 and the length of B3 is 1.

The last pair (1,1) corresponds to the pair (R2,B4) and it indicates that the length of R2 is 1 and the length of B4 is 1.

Note: An n-tuple of clause attributes is similar (but not the same) to the feature vector named by Stephan Schulz, PhD (see E equational theorem prover).
