= Kenny Easwaran =

American philosopher

Education
- Education: Stanford University (B.A.); UC Berkeley (Ph.D.)
- Thesis: The Foundations of Conditional Probability (2008)
- Doctoral advisor: Branden Fitelson

Philosophical work
- Era: Contemporary philosophy
- Region: Western philosophy
- School: Analytic
- Institutions: Texas A&M University; University of California, Irvine
- Main interests: Epistemology, decision theory, mathematical logic, philosophy of mathematics
- Website: http://www.kennyeaswaran.org

Kenny Easwaran is an Indian-American philosopher and Associate Professor of Philosophy at the University of California, Irvine.

His expertise lies in epistemology, decision theory, mathematical logic and philosophy of mathematics. Easwaran is an associate editor of Journal of Philosophical Logic. Two of his articles have been selected as among the "ten best" of their year by the Philosopher's Annual.

== See also ==
- Forcing (mathematics)
