= Superposition calculus =

The superposition calculus is a calculus for reasoning in equational logic. It was developed in the early 1990s and combines concepts from first-order resolution with ordering-based equality handling as developed in the context of (unfailing) Knuth–Bendix completion. It can be seen as a generalization of either resolution (to equational logic) or unfailing completion (to full clausal logic). Like most first-order calculi, superposition tries to show the unsatisfiability of a set of first-order clauses, i.e. it performs proofs by refutation. Superposition is refutation complete—given unlimited resources and a fair derivation strategy, from any unsatisfiable clause set a contradiction will eventually be derived.

Many (state-of-the-art) theorem provers for first-order logic are based on superposition (e.g. the E equational theorem prover), although only a few implement the pure calculus.

== Implementations ==
- E
- SPASS
- Vampire
- Waldmeister (official web page)
