= IsaPlanner =

Software for automated theorem proving

IsaPlanner is a proof planner for the interactive proof assistant, Isabelle, originally developed by Lucas Dixon.
