= Susan Gerhart =

American computer scientist

- Education: Ohio Wesleyan University, University of Michigan, Carnegie Mellon University
- Scientific career
- Fields: Computer science
- Workplaces: Duke University, Wang Institute of Graduate Studies, and Embry-Riddle Aeronautical University
- Thesis: Verification of APL Programs (1972)
- Doctoral advisor: Donald W. Loveland

Susan Gerhart is a semi-retired computer scientist.

== Education ==
Susan Gerhart received her BA in Mathematics from Ohio Wesleyan University, her MS in Communication Sciences from University of Michigan, and her PhD in Computer Science from Carnegie Mellon University. She completed her thesis "Verification of APL Programs" in 1972 under thesis advisor Donald W. Loveland. She credited Sputnik with having inspired her to study science.

== Career ==
=== Teaching ===
She has taught software engineering and computer science at Toronto, Duke University, Wang Institute of Graduate Studies, and Embry-Riddle Aeronautical University.

She established a project to develop curricula to increase security in aviation-oriented computing education. This project produced several papers and modules, including one on buffer overflow vulnerabilities.

Her other publications include "Toward a theory of test data selection", "An International Survey of Industrial Applications of Formal Methods. Volume 2. Case Studies", and "Do Web search engines suppress controversy?".

=== Systers ===
In 1987 Gerhart was one of the founding members of Systers, the oldest and largest mailing list for women in computing.

=== Macular Degeneration Advocacy ===
Having been personally impacted by macular degeneration, she maintains the "As Your World Changes" blog on using technology, including podcasts, to overcome vision loss. In 2009 she spoke at the IEEE conference on Software Testing, Verification and Validation on "The Disability/Mobility Challenge: Formulating Criteria for Testing Accessibility and Usability".
