= Soundness =

Term in logic and deductive reasoning

In logic, soundness can refer to either a property of arguments or a property of formal deductive systems.

An argument is sound if (and only if) it is both valid in form and has no false premises.

A formal system is sound if (and only if) every well-formed formula that can be proven in the system is logically valid with respect to the logical semantics of the system.

These two properties are different but closely related. The former is more relevant for introductory deductive reasoning contexts and the latter arises in metalogic and mathematical logic.

== Definition for arguments ==
In deductive reasoning, a sound argument is an argument that is valid and all of its premises are true (and as a consequence its conclusion is true as well). An argument is valid if, assuming its premises are true, the conclusion must be true. An example of a sound argument is the following well-known syllogism:

(premises)
All men are mortal.
Socrates is a man.
(conclusion)
Therefore, Socrates is mortal.

Because of the logical necessity of the conclusion, this argument is valid; and because the argument is valid and its premises are true, the argument is sound.

However, an argument can be valid without being sound. For example:

All birds can fly.
Penguins are birds.
Therefore, penguins can fly.

This argument is valid as the conclusion must be true assuming the premises are true. However, the first premise is false. Not all birds can fly (for example, Penguins). For an argument to be sound, the argument must be valid and its premises must be true.

Some authors, such as Lemmon, have used the term "soundness" as synonymous with what is now meant by "validity", which left them with no particular word for what is now called "soundness". But nowadays, this division of the terms is very widespread.

== Definition for formal systems ==
In mathematical logic, a logical system has the soundness property if every formula that can be proved in the system is logically valid with respect to the semantics of the system. In most cases, this comes down to its rules having the property of preserving truth. The converse of soundness is known as completeness.

A logical system with syntactic entailment $\vdash$ and semantic entailment $\models$ is sound if for any sequence $A_1, A_2, ..., A_n$ of sentences in its language, if $A_1, A_2, ..., A_n\vdash C$, then $A_1, A_2, ..., A_n\models C$. In other words, a system is sound when all of its theorems are validities.

Soundness is among the most fundamental properties of mathematical logic. The soundness property provides the initial reason for counting a logical system as desirable. The completeness property means that every validity (truth) is provable. Together they imply that all and only validities are provable.

Most proofs of soundness are trivial. For example, in an axiomatic system, proof of soundness amounts to verifying the validity of the axioms and that the rules of inference preserve validity (or the weaker property, truth). If the system allows Hilbert-style deduction, it requires only verifying the validity of the axioms and one rule of inference, namely modus ponens (and sometimes substitution).

Soundness properties come in two main varieties: weak and strong soundness, of which the former is a restricted form of the latter. Strong soundness is the definition given earlier in this section and weak soundness restricts this to sentences which are provable from no premises, i.e., when there are no sentences to the right of the turnstiles.

=== Weak soundness ===
Weak soundness of a deductive system is the property that any sentence that is provable from no premises in that deductive system is also true on all interpretations or structures of the semantic theory for the language upon which that theory is based. Symbolically we write, if $\vdash C$ then $\vDash C$. Some writers will explicitly include the empty set, giving if $\emptyset \vdash C$ then $\emptyset \models C$. Using the narrow definition of theorem, for sentences provable from no premises, weak soundness says that all theorems are tautologies.

=== Strong soundness ===
Strong soundness of a deductive system is the property that any sentence $C$ that is provable from a (possibly empty) set of premises/sentences $\Gamma = \{A_1, A_2, ..., A_n\}$ is also a semantic consequence of that set, i.e., $C$ is true in any model that makes all members of $\Gamma$. Symbolically we write, if $\Gamma \vdash C$, then $\Gamma \models C$. Notice that when $\Gamma$ is empty, we have the statement of weak soundness.

=== Arithmetic soundness ===
If T is a theory whose objects of discourse can be interpreted as natural numbers, we say T is arithmetically sound if all theorems of T are actually true about the standard mathematical integers. For further information, see ω-consistent theory.

=== Relation to completeness ===
The converse of the soundness property is the completeness property. A deductive system with a semantic theory is strongly complete if every sentence $C$ that is a semantic consequence of a set of sentences $\Gamma$ can be derived in the deduction system from that set. In symbols: if $\Gamma \models C$ then $\Gamma \vdash C$. Completeness of first-order logic was first explicitly established by Gödel, though some of the main results were contained in earlier work of Skolem.

Informally, a soundness theorem for a deductive system expresses that all provable sentences are true. Completeness states that all true sentences are provable.

Gödel's first incompleteness theorem shows that for languages sufficient for doing a certain amount of arithmetic, there can be no consistent and effective deductive system that is complete with respect to the intended interpretation of the symbolism of that language. Thus, not all sound deductive systems are complete in this special sense of completeness, in which the class of models (up to isomorphism) is restricted to the intended one. The original completeness proof applies to all classical models, not some special proper subclass of intended ones.

== See also ==
- Analytic–synthetic distinction
- Form and content
- Soundness (interactive proof)
- Type soundness

== Bibliography ==
- Hinman, P. (2005). Fundamentals of Mathematical Logic. A K Peters. ISBN 1-56881-262-0.
- Copi, Irving (1979), Symbolic Logic (5th ed.), Macmillan Publishing Co., ISBN 0-02-324880-7
- Boolos, Burgess, Jeffrey. Computability and Logic, 4th Ed, Cambridge, 2002.
