= L.J. Foret =

Lawrence Joseph (L.J.) Foret (June 30, 1930 — September 12, 2002) was an American Cajun musician from the Houma, Louisiana area.

He was a singer and songwriter, played drums, guitar and fiddle. He began his career at age 14 playing with his father in the Town Serenaders; went on to lead his own band, L.J. Foret and His Country Boys. He also hosted a local radio and television show. He was inducted into the Louisiana Music Hall of Fame in 2000, and was awarded the South Louisiana Pioneer Award for songwriting and performing. He is the father of musician Ronnie Foret. Foret died in 2002 at the age of 72.

- L.J. Foret Cajun Country Singer, La Louisiane Records (LL-138)
