= Test & Performance Tools Platform =

- Developer: Free and open source software community
- Written in: Java
- Operating system: Cross-platform: Linux, Mac OS X, Solaris, Windows
- Platform: Eclipse (IDE)
- Available in: Multilingual
- Type: Software development
- License: Eclipse Public License
- Website: www.eclipse.org

The Test & Performance Tools Platform (TPTP) is an Eclipse tool used to profile plug-ins of the IDE that may run on different platforms. TPTP is tightly integrated into Eclipse so that it can make the profiling from within the IDE. It is used to find and isolate performance problems. Such problems can be performance bottlenecks, object leaks, or system resource limits. It can be used with both simple and complex applications, like stand-alone applications, plug-ins, or multi-machine enterprise applications.

As TPTP is integrated into the Eclipse project, it can be easily extended.

TPTP will not be available in releases of Eclipse 3.7 (Indigo) as it undergoes archival from the Eclipse project.

== See also ==
- Eclipse
