= Lightweight Java =

Lightweight Java (LJ) is a fully formalized and extensible minimal imperative fragment of Java. The language was designed for academic purposes within the Computer Laboratory, University of Cambridge. The definition of LJ was proven type-sound in Isabelle/HOL.

== See also ==
- Lightweight programming language
