= William McCune =

American computer scientist and logician

William Walker McCune
- Born: December 17, 1953
- Died: May 2, 2011 (aged 57)
- Known for: Otter, Mace4, Prover9, Robbins conjecture
- Scientific career
- Fields: Computer technology
- Workplaces: Argonne National Laboratory (1984–2006); University of New Mexico (2006–2011)

William Walker McCune (December 17, 1953 – May 2, 2011) was an American computer scientist and logician working in the fields of automated reasoning, algebra, logic, and formal methods.

== Biography ==
He was best known for the development of the Otter, Prover9, and Mace4 automated reasoning systems, and the automated proof of the Robbins conjecture using the EQP theorem prover.

In 2000, McCune received the Herbrand Award for Distinguished Contributions to Automated Reasoning. In 2013, Automated Reasoning and Mathematics - Essays in Memory of William W. McCune was published in his honour.
