= Ljay =

Ljay is a masculine given name. Notable people with the name include:

- Ljay Gonzales (born 1998), Filipino basketball player
- Ljay Newsome (born 1996), American baseball player
