= Vampire (theorem prover) =

Vampire Theorem Prover
- Original author: Andrei Voronkov
- Developer: Vampire team
- Stable release: 4.5.1 / 2020-07-15
- Written in: C++
- Available in: Vampire Modified BSD Licence
- Type: Automated theorem proving
- Website: vprover.github.io
- Repository: github.com/vprover/vampire

Vampire is an automatic theorem prover for first-order classical logic developed in the Department of Computer Science at the University of Manchester. Up to Version 3, it was developed by Andrei Voronkov together with Kryštof Hoder and previously (the first six annual releases) with Alexandre Riazanov. Since Version 4, the development has involved a wider international team including Laura Kovacs, Giles Reger, and Martin Suda. Since 1999 it has won at least 53 trophies in the CADE ATP System Competition, the "world cup for theorem provers", including the most prestigious FOF division and the theory-reasoning TFA division.

== Background ==
Vampire's kernel implements the calculi of ordered binary resolution and superposition (for handling equality). The splitting rule and negative equality splitting can be simulated by the introduction of new predicate definitions and dynamic folding of such definitions. A DPLL-style algorithm splitting is also supported. A number of standard redundancy criteria and simplification techniques are used for pruning the search space: tautology deletion, subsumption resolution, rewriting by ordered unit equalities, basicness restrictions and irreducibility of substitution terms. The reduction ordering on terms is the standard Knuth–Bendix ordering.

A number of efficient indexing techniques are used to implement all major operations on sets of terms and clauses. Run-time algorithm specialisation is used to accelerate forward matching.

Although the kernel of the system works only with conjunctive normal forms, the preprocessor component accepts a problem in the full first-order logic syntax, clausifies it and performs a number of useful transformations before passing the result to the kernel. When a theorem is proven, the system produces a verifiable proof, which validates both the clausification phase and the refutation of the conjunctive normal form.

Along with proving theorems, Vampire has other related functionalities such as generating interpolants.

Executables can be obtained from the system website. As of November 2020, Vampire is released under a modified version of the BSD 3-clause licence that explicitly permits commercial use. Previous versions were available under a proprietary non-commercial licence.
