= L. J. Maxwell =

American politician

L. J. Maxwell (born c. 1851) was a state legislator in Arkansas. A Republican, he represented Jefferson County, Arkansas in the Arkansas House of Representatives in 1874 and 1875. Another African-American Legislator Ned Hill also served in the House from Jefferson County for the same two-year period. The following year in 1876, Maxwell ran for State Senator but lost to George Haycock.

== Biography ==
In 1883 Maxwell represented Jefferson County as a delegate at the State Convention. The same year he was appointed as the railway postal clerk. In 1894 he made another run for representative, but was unsuccessful.

== See also ==
- African American officeholders from the end of the Civil War until before 1900
