= SPASS =

Automated theorem prover

SPASS is an automated theorem prover for first-order logic with equality developed at the Max Planck Institute for Computer Science and using the superposition calculus. The name originally stood for Synergetic Prover Augmenting Superposition with Sorts. The theorem-proving system is released under the FreeBSD license.

An extension of SPASS called SPASS-XDB added support for on-the-fly retrieval of positive unit axioms from external sources. SPASS-XDB can thus incorporate facts coming from relational databases, web services, or linked data servers. Support for arithmetic using Mathematica was also added.

== Sources ==
- Weidenbach, Christoph; Dimova, Dilyana; Fietzke, Arnaud; Kumar, Rohit; Suda, Martin; Wischnewski, Patrick (2009), "SPASS Version 3.5", CADE-22: 22nd International Conference on Automated Deduction, Springer, pp. 140–145.
