= CADE ATP System Competition =

Annual automated theorem proving competition

The CADE ATP System Competition (CASC) is an annual competition of fully automated theorem provers for classical logic.

== Competition ==
CASC is associated with the Conference on Automated Deduction and the International Joint Conference on Automated Reasoning organized by the Association for Automated Reasoning. It has inspired similar competition in related fields, in particular the successful SMT-COMP competition for satisfiability modulo theories, the SAT Competition for propositional reasoners, and the modal logic reasoning competition.

The first CASC, CASC-13, was held as part of the 13th Conference on Automated Deduction at Rutgers University, New Brunswick, NJ, in 1996. Among the systems competing were Otter and SETHEO.

== See also ==
- List of computer science awards
