= Aleph (disambiguation) =

Aleph is the first letter of many Semitic abjads (alphabets).

Aleph may also refer to:

== Science, technology and mathematics ==
- ALEPH experiment (Apparatus for LEP Physics at CERN), detector of the Large Electron-Positron Collider
- Aleph kernel, a computer operating system kernel
- Aleph number, in mathematics set theory
- Aleph, an advanced system for inductive logic programming
- Aleph (Automated Library Expandable Program), software by Ex Libris Group
- Aleph, an investigative data platform containing an archive of government records and open databases, maintained by OCCRP
- Aleph (TeX), a TeX engine extension consolidating Unicode features from Omega and directional features from ε-TeX
- Aleph (psychedelic), a psychoactive drug

== Literature ==
- Aleph (novel), by Brazilian author Paulo Coelho
- The Aleph and Other Stories, short story collection by Argentine author Jorge Luis Borges
  - "The Aleph" (short story), title work of the collection
- Aleph, a character in the Warren Ellis comic series Global Frequency
- Aleph, a plot element in the novel Mona Lisa Overdrive by William Gibson
- Aleph (א), a shorthand designation for Codex Sinaiticus, a 4th-century manuscript of the Bible

== Music ==
- Aleph (band), a 1980s Italo disco band
- Aleph (pianist), stage name of Fady Abi Saad, born 1980)
- Aleph, a 2013 album by Gesaffelstein
- "The Aleph", a song on the album Saints by Destroy the Runner
- "Aleph", a song by Anahí
- Aleph, a record label founded by Lalo Schifrin

== Organizations ==
- Aleph Institute, a Jewish humanitarian organization for both prisoners and military personnel
- ALEPH: Alliance for Jewish Renewal
- Aleph Zadik Aleph, international youth-led fraternal organization for Jewish teenagers
- Aleph Melbourne, an LGBT Jewish organization
- Aleph, the current name of the Japanese cult and terrorist group Aum Shinrikyo

== People with the surname ==
- Patrick Aleph (born 1983), American writer and musician

== Other ==
- Aleph (film), a silent film by Wallace Berman
- Aleph (journal), an academic journal on Jewish history and the history of science
- Aleph One, the game engine of the Marathon video game trilogy
- Aleph Sailing Team, a French America's Cup syndicate
- Mount Aleph, a location in the video game Golden Sun
- Aleph, the protagonist of the video game Shin Megami Tensei II
- Aleph, the highest and most threatening ranking for Abnormalities in the Korean video game Lobotomy Corporation
- Aleph, a playable character in the mobile game Reverse: 1999
- Aleph (ILP), an inductive logic programming system

== See also ==
- Alef (disambiguation)
