= Random flip-flop =

Unconventional logic circuit

Random flip-flop (RFF) is a theoretical concept of a non-sequential logic circuit capable of generating true randomness. By definition, it operates as an "ordinary" edge-triggered clocked flip-flop, except that its clock input acts randomly and with probability p = 1/2. Unlike Boolean circuits, which behave deterministically, a random flip-flop behaves non-deterministically. By definition, a random flip-flop is electrically compatible with Boolean logic circuits, and when they are used together, RFFs make up a full set of logic circuits capable of performing arbitrary algorithms, realizing a Probabilistic Turing machine.

== Symbol ==
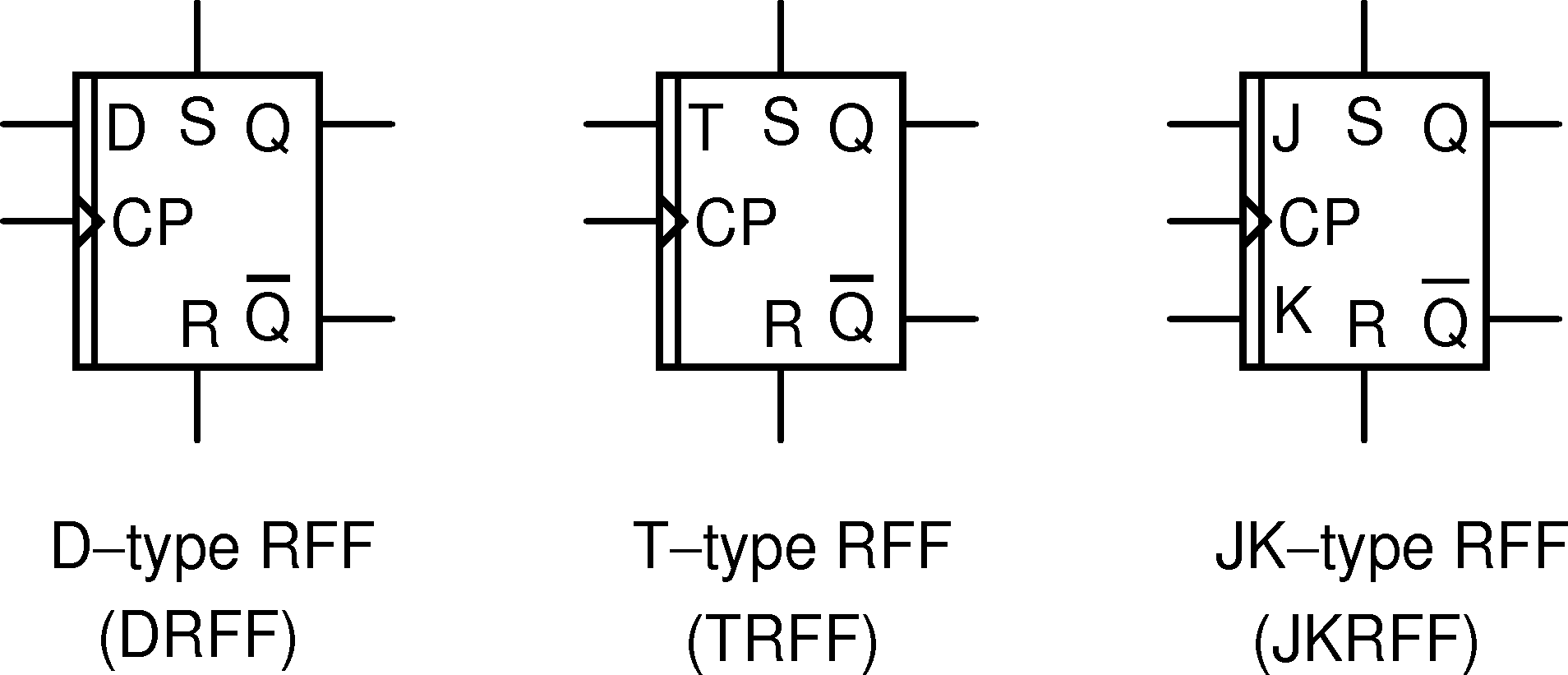
Figure 1. A variety of random flip-flops

Random flip-flops come in all varieties in which ordinary, edge triggered clocked flip-flops do, for example: D-type random flip-flop (DRFF). T-type random flip-flop (TRFF), JK-type random flip-flop (JKRFF), etc. Symbols for DRFF, TRFF and JKRFF are shown in Fig. 1.

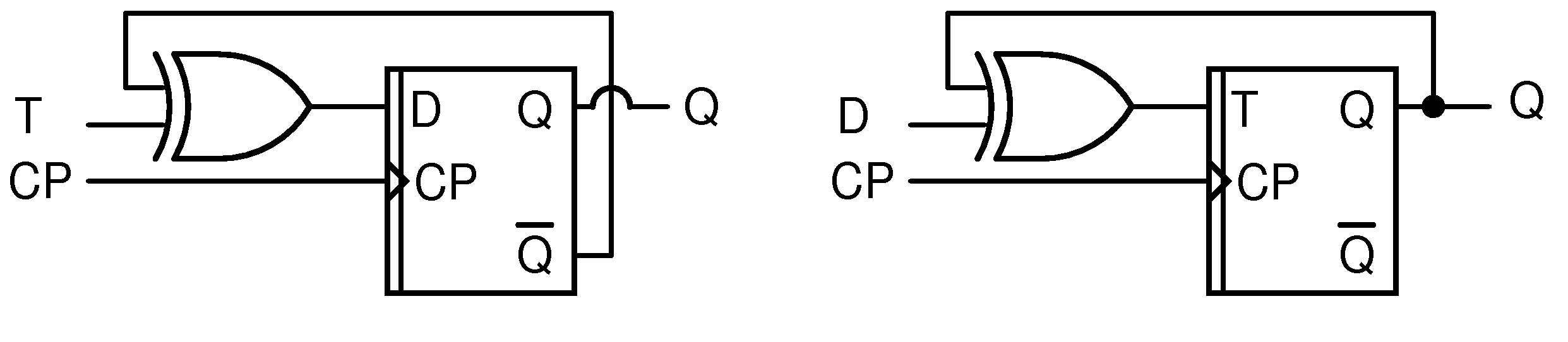
Figure 2. Emulation of a TRFF by a DRFF and vice versa.

While varieties are possible, not all of them are needed: a single RFF type can be used to emulate all other types. Emulation of one type of RFF by a different type of RFF can be done using the same additional gates as for ordinary flip-flops. Examples are shown in Fig. 2.

== Practical realization of random flip-flop ==
By definition, the action of a theoretical RFF is truly random. This is difficult to achieve in practice and is probably best realized through use of physical randomness. An RFF, based on the quantum-random effect of photon emission in a semiconductor and its subsequent detection, has been demonstrated to work well up to a clock frequency of 25 MHz. At a higher clock frequency, the subsequent actions of the RFF become correlated. This RFF has been built using bulk components and the effort resulted only in a handful of units. Recently, a monolithic chip containing 2800 integrated RFFs based on quantum randomness has been demonstrated in a Bipolar-CMOS-DMOS (BCD) process.

== Applications ==
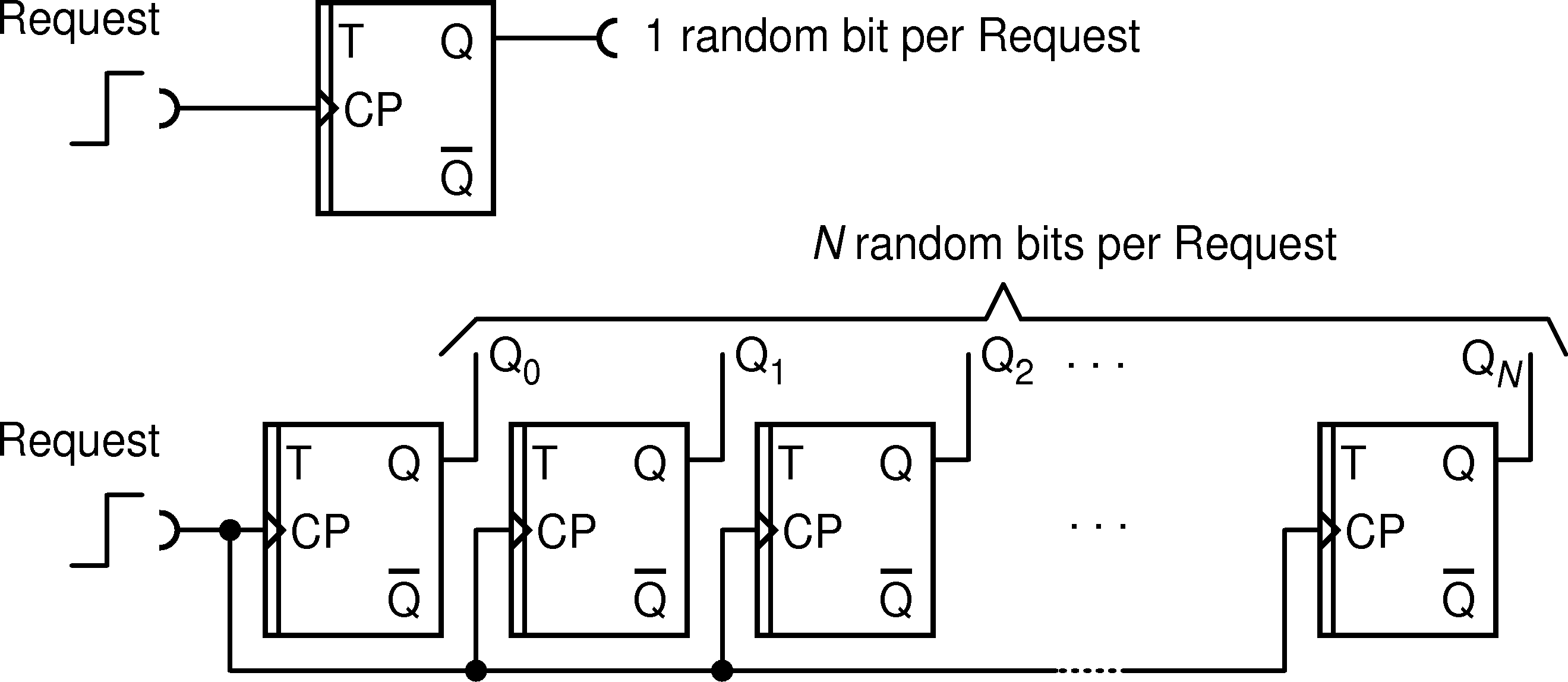
Figure 3. Random number generators by use of an RFF. An RFF can work up to a certain request (clock) rate. One can use N RFFs to enhance bit production rate by a factor of N.

One straightforward application of an RFF is generation of random bits, as shown in Fig. 3.

Since each RFF operates independently of the others, a group of N RFFs can generate N bits per clock, thus the overall generation throughput of a random number generator is only limited by the number of available RFFs and their maximum operating clock frequency.

The biggest difference between an RFF and a true random number generator is that a plethora of RFFs can work concurrently, independently of each other, with or without any synchronicity among them. This is useful in stochastic computing, also known as Random Pulse Computing (RPC)[1], where many information-processing circuits work in parallel. RFF could also find its use in prosthetic implants such as artificial cochlear or prosthetic limbs using, near-sensor image processing as well as in artificial intelligence processors. Furthermore, in consideration of its high speed, a single RFF can be used to generate on the order of hundred thousand 256-bit cryptographic keys per second, or nonce data, without requiring any special or proprietary protocol to communicate with, making it a potentially indispensable piece of security hardware such as IoT devices, smart cards, car keys, as well as of any computer or digital communication device.

While the technology of realizing an RFF on a chip is young, it is conceivable that in the future, the RFF, as an electronic element, will appear in universal logic chips (such as 7400-series integrated circuits), in Application Specific Integrated Circuits (ASIC), and in Field-Programmable Gate Array (FPGA) chips, thus facilitating designs that could benefit from it.
