= Dov Schwartz =

Israeli professor of Jewish thought (born 1961)

- דב שוורץ
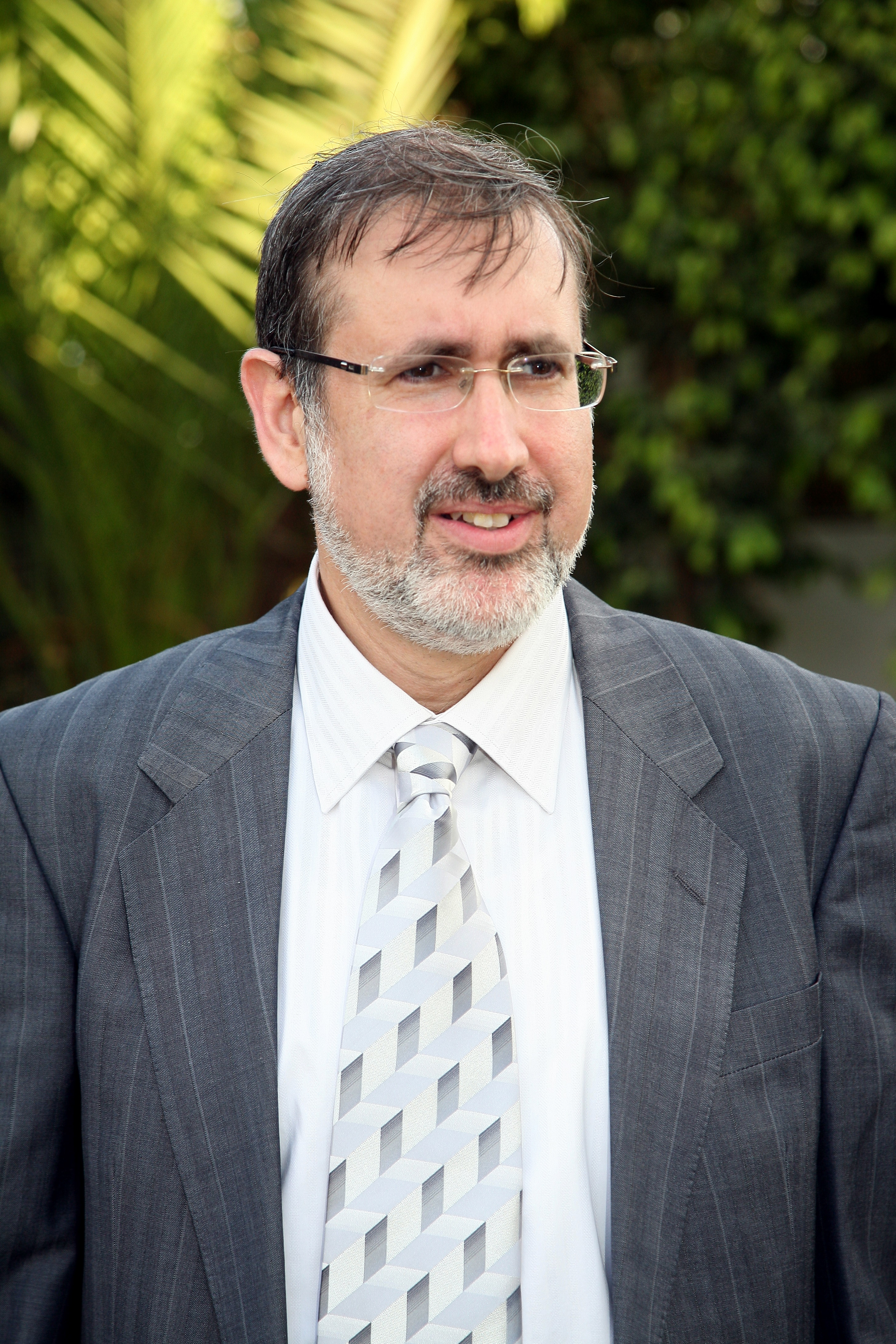
- Born: 16 August 1961 (age 65); Haifa, Israel

Academic background
- Education: Yavne High School; Reali School; Yeshivat Kerem B'Yavneh; Bar-Ilan University
- Alma mater: Bar-Ilan University
- Thesis: The Philosophical–Religious Thought of Rabbi Samuel ibn Seneh Zarza
- Doctoral advisor: Abraham Noriel

Academic work
- Discipline: Humanities
- Sub-discipline: Jewish Thought
- Institutions: Bar-Ilan University

Dov Schwartz (Hebrew: דב שוורץ, born August 16, 1961) is an Israeli professor of Jewish thought and former dean of the Faculty of Humanities at Bar-Ilan University. In 2015, he was awarded the Emet Prize in Jewish Thought, and he received the Israel Prize in Jewish Thought for the year 2023.

== Biography ==
Schwartz was born and raised in Haifa as the only child of Holocaust survivors. He attended both Yavne High School (Hebrew: בית ספר יבנה) and the Reali School (Hebrew: בית הספר הריאלי) alternately, and was an active member of the Bnei Akiva youth movement. He continued his studies at Yeshivat Kerem B'Yavneh, where he authored several articles on the thought of Rabbi David Cohen (known as "The Nazir").

== Career ==
In 1986, Schwartz began his studies at Bar-Ilan University. During his second year, he was unexpectedly appointed to teach three courses in place of an ailing lecturer. Approximately four years after commencing his academic studies, he completed his doctoral dissertation under the supervision of Professor Abraham Noriel, entitled "The Philosophical–Religious Thought of Rabbi Samuel ibn Seneh Zarza". He later served as the head of the Department of Jewish Philosophy at Bar-Ilan University and as the dean of its Faculty of Humanities.

Schwartz has authored over 30 books and around 200 articles. His work spans a wide range of periods in Jewish thought—from medieval thinkers to modern Jewish philosophy and postmodern perspectives. His primary research interests include medieval Jewish philosophy, the thought of Religious Zionism, and Chabad Hasidism, among others.

Some of his innovative ideas initially sparked controversy but were later embraced in academic circles. For example, his assertion that Rabbi Kook’s thought should be understood as part of an intellectual circle—including his close disciples (his son Rabbi Zvi Yehuda Kook, Rabbi David Cohen, and Rabbi Yaakov Moshe Charlap)—challenged the prevailing view at the Hebrew University, which maintained that Rabbi Kook's ideas should be considered separately from those of his followers. In his writings, Schwartz generally seeks to identify a common ideological denominator among various thinkers and eras to better understand their contributions.

In his books and articles on Religious Zionism, Schwartz argues that a deep understanding of the movement requires familiarity with its theological roots and early thinkers. He has also extensively examined the thought of Rabbi Joseph Dov Soloveitchik and currently heads the chair for teaching his thought at Bar-Ilan University.

== Personal life ==
Schwartz lives in Givat Shmuel with his wife, Gila, and their six children.

== Awards ==
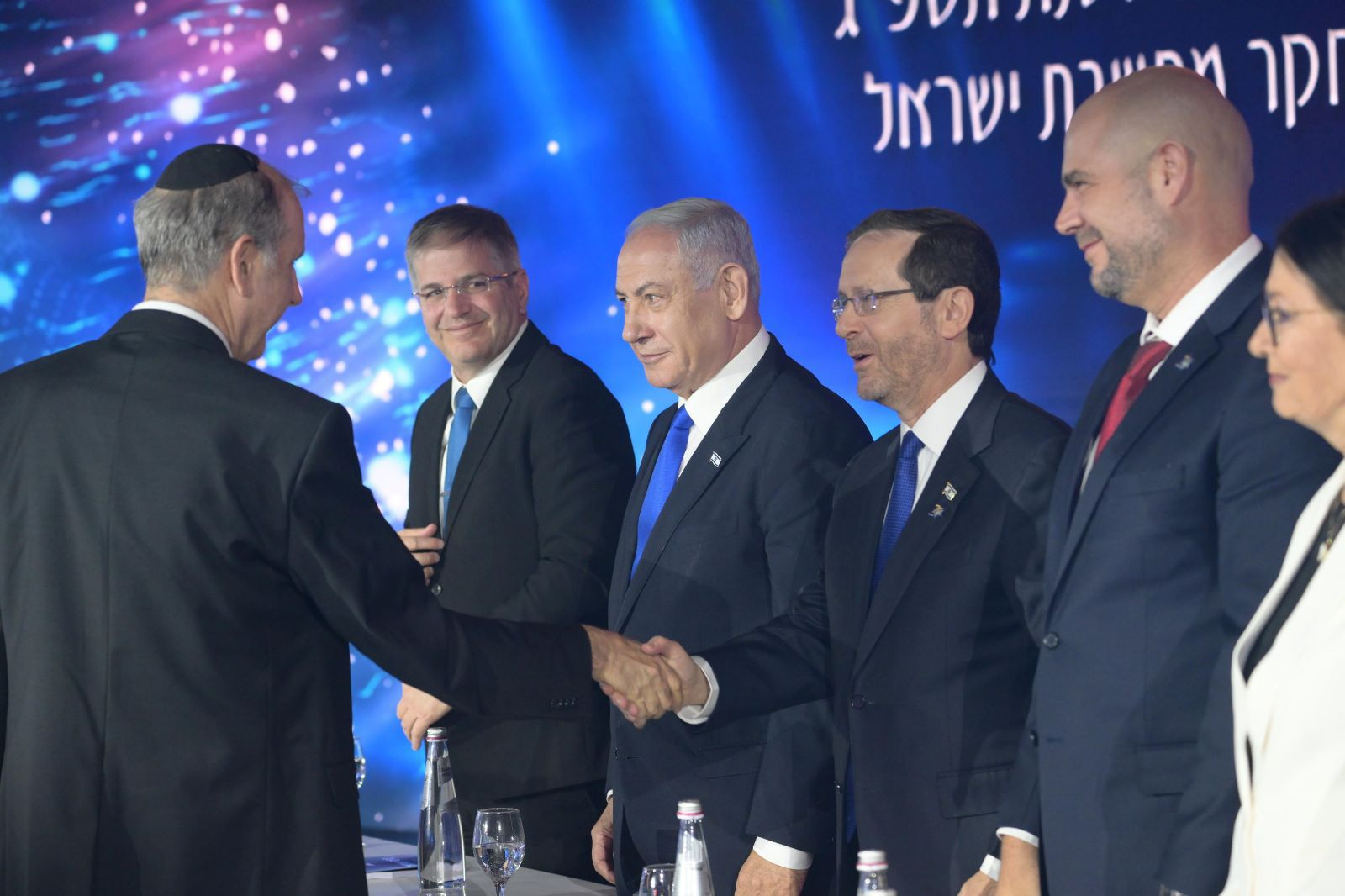
Dov Schwartz receives the Israel Prize from President Isaac Herzog and Prime Minister Benjamin Netanyahu

- 1999: Aminoah Award of Hapo`el Hamizrahi, for The Theology of the Religious Zionist Movement. Tel Aviv: Am Oved, 1996 [Heb].
- 2001 :Bar-Ilan University, Research Authority, Special Award for Contradiction and Concealment in Medieval Jewish Thought.
- 2001: Goldstein-Goren Book Award for the best recent book in Jewish thought, Ben Gurion University, for Astral Magic in Medieval Jewish Thought. Ramat-Gan: Bar-Ilan University Press, 1999 [Heb]. Ramat-Gan: Bar-Ilan University Press, 2001 [Heb].
- 2004: Hecht Prize of the Herzl Institute for Research and Study of Zionism, University of Haifa for Challenge and Crisis in Rabbi Kook’s Circle. Tel Aviv: Am Oved, 2002 [Heb].
- 2015: Emet Prize in Jewish Thought.
- 2023: Israel Prize in Jewish Thought.

== Published works ==
Schwartz has authored over 30 books and around 200 articles.

=== Books in English ===
- Central Problems of Medieval Jewish Philosophy, Leiden: Brill 2005. ISBN 978-9004148055
- Studies on Astral Magic in Medieval Jewish Philosophy, Leiden: Brill 2005. ISBN 978-9004142343
- Religious Zionism: History and Ideology, Boston: Academic Studies Press 2009. ISBN 978-1934843253
- The Religious Genius in Rabbi Kook's Thought: National "Saint"? Boston: Academic Studies Press 2014. ISBN 978-1618114112
- The Many Faces of Maimonides, Boston: Academic Studies Press 2018. ISBN 978-1618119063
- Religious Zionism and the Six Day War: From Realism to Messianism, London: Routledge 2019 (with Avi Sagi). ISBN 978-1138353855.

=== Articles in English ===
- “‘Kol Dodi Dofek’: A Religious-Zionist Alternative”. Tradition: A Journal of Orthodox Jewish Thought 39, no. 3 (2006): 59–72. JSTOR http://www.jstor.org/stable/23262866
- “From Theurgy to Magic: The Evolution of the Magical-Talismanic Justification of Sacrifice in the Circle of Nahmanides and His Interpreters”. Aleph, no. 1 (2001): 165–213. JSTOR http://www.jstor.org/stable/40385451
- “The Debate over the Maimonidean Theory of Providence in Thirteenth-Century Jewish Philosophy.” Jewish Studies Quarterly 2, no. 2 (1995): 185–96. JSTOR http://www.jstor.org/stable/40753128
