= Alef (disambiguation) =

Alef or aleph is the first letter of the Semitic abjads.

Alef may also refer to:

== People ==
- Alef Poh-ji (born 1987), Thai football player
- Alef (footballer, born 1993), Alef Vieira Santos, Brazilian football centre-back
- Alef (footballer, born 1995), Alef dos Santos Saldanha, Brazilian football midfielder
- Abba Alef, one of the Nine Saints of Ethiopia
- Alef, (perhaps semi-legendary) 11th-century last king of Dumnonia

== Other uses ==
- Alef (programming language)
- Alef (font)
- Alef Aeronautics (flying car company)
- Alef Bank, a bank in Russia
- Degania Alef, a kibbutz in northern Israel
- HAT-P-9b or Alef, an exoplanet
- Liga Alef, the third tier of the Israeli football league
- Masada: Alef, sometimes simply Alef, album by John Zorn
- Alef. taxonomic author abbreviation in botany for Friedrich Alefeld
- Alef Network, a defunct Argentine cable television channel

== See also ==
- Aleph (disambiguation)
