= Jacques Herbrand =

French mathematician (1908–1931)

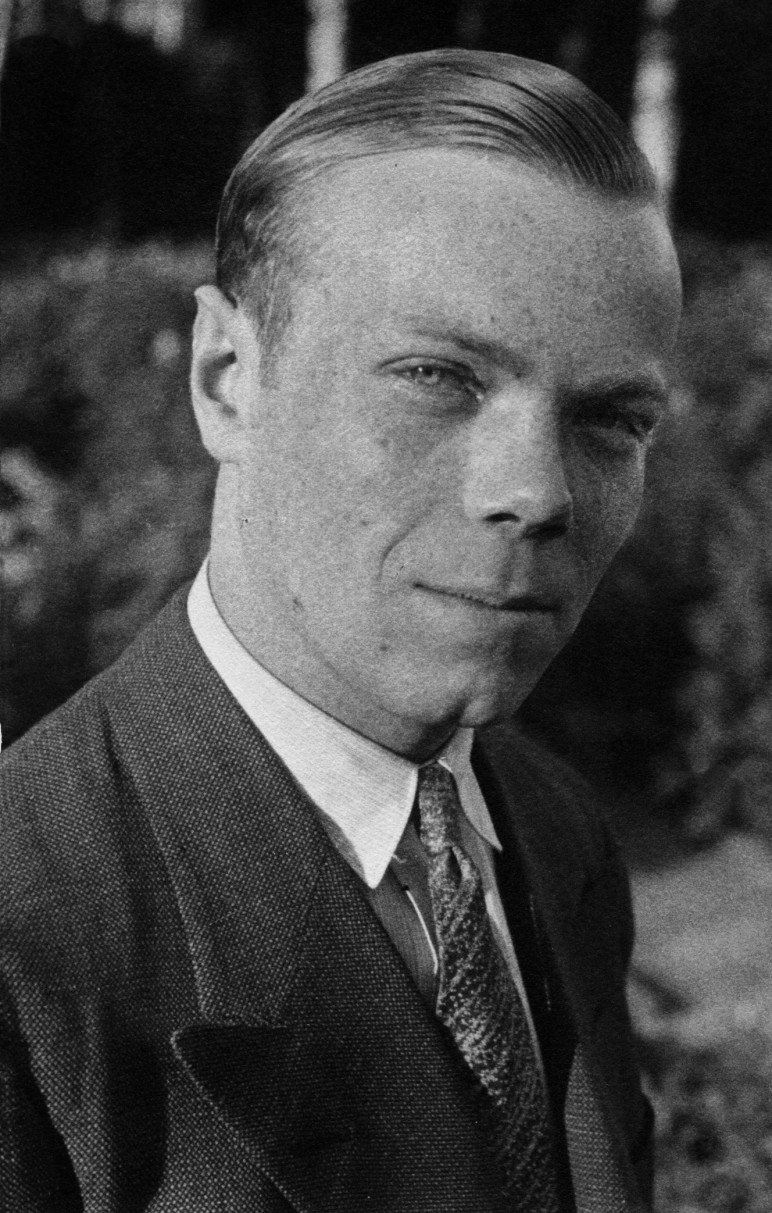
- Herbrand in summer 1931, as photographed by Natascha Artin Brunswick
- Born: 12 February 1908; Paris, France
- Died: 27 July 1931 (aged 23); La Bérarde, Isère, France
- Education: École Normale Supérieure; University of Paris (PhD, 1930)
- Known for: Herbrand's theorem Herbrand–Ribet theorem Herbrand quotient
- Scientific career
- Fields: Mathematical logic, class field theory
- Thesis: Recherches sur la théorie de la démonstration (Investigations on Proof Theory) (1930)
- Doctoral advisor: Ernest Vessiot

Jacques Herbrand (12 February 1908 – 27 July 1931) was a French mathematician. Although he died at age 23, he was already considered one of "the greatest mathematicians of the younger generation" by his professors Helmut Hasse and Richard Courant.

He worked in mathematical logic and class field theory. He introduced recursive functions. Herbrand's theorem refers to either of two completely different theorems. One is a result from his doctoral thesis in proof theory, and the other one half of the Herbrand–Ribet theorem on the class group of cyclotomic number fields. The Herbrand quotient is a type of Euler characteristic, used in homological algebra. He contributed to Hilbert's program in the foundations of mathematics by providing a constructive consistency proof for a weak system of arithmetic. The proof uses the above-mentioned, proof-theoretic Herbrand's theorem.

== Biography ==
Herbrand finished his doctorate at École Normale Supérieure in Paris under Ernest Vessiot in 1929. He joined the army in October 1929, however, and so did not defend his thesis at the Sorbonne until the following year. He was awarded a Rockefeller fellowship that enabled him to study in Germany in 1930-1931, first with John von Neumann in Berlin, then during June with Emil Artin in Hamburg, and finally with Emmy Noether in Göttingen.

In Berlin, Herbrand followed a course on Hilbert's proof theory given by von Neumann. During the course, von Neumann explained Gödel's first incompleteness theorem and found, independently of Gödel, the second incompleteness theorem that he also presented in the lectures. A letter of Herbrand's of 5 December 1930 to his friend Claude Chevalley contains a description of von Neumann's idea. An earlier letter to Vessiot, of 28 November, explained Gödel's first incompleteness theorem in the form of failure of omega-consistency.

Herbrand's last paper was titled "Sur la non-contradiction de l'arithmétique" (On the consistency of arithmetic). It contains a consistency proof for a restricted system of arithmetic, similar to a result of von Neumann's. Herbrand had studied Gödel's incompleteness article in Easter 1931 through the page proofs Paul Bernays had lent him. In the last section of his paper, Herbrand makes a comparison of his restricted result to that of Gödel's. The paper was received by the editors the very same day Herbrand lost his life, 27 July, and published posthumously.

== Death ==
In July 1931, Herbrand was mountain-climbing in the French Alps with two friends when he fell to his death in the granite mountains of Massif des Écrins.

== Quotation ==
"Jacques Herbrand would have hated Bourbaki" said French mathematician Claude Chevalley quoted in Michèle Chouchan, "Nicolas Bourbaki Faits et légendes", Éditions du choix, 1995.

== Bibliography ==
- Claus-Peter Wirth and Jörg Siekmann and Christoph Benzmüller and Serge Autexier (2009). Lectures on Jacques Herbrand as a Logician (SEKI Report). DFKI. arXiv:0902.4682.

Primary literature:

- 1967. Jean van Heijenoort (ed.), From Frege to Gödel: A Source Book in Mathematical Logic, 1879–1931. Cambridge, Massachusetts: Harvard Univ. Press.
  - 1930. "Investigations in proof theory," 525–81.
  - 1931. "On the consistency of arithmetic," 618–28.
- 1968. Jean van Heijenoort (ed.), Jacques Herbrand, Écrits logiques. Paris: Presses Universitaires de France.
- 1971. Warren David Goldfarb (transl., ed.), Logical Writings of Jacques Herbrand Cambridge, Massachusetts: Harvard University Press.

== See also ==
- Herbrand interpretation
- Herbrand structure
- Herbrand Award – by the Conference on Automated Deduction, for automated deduction
- Prix Jacques Herbrand – by the French Academy of Sciences, for mathematics and physics
- Herbrandization – a validity-preserving normal form of a formula, dual to Skolemization
- Herbrand's theorem on ramification groups
- Rollo Davidson (1944–1970) – another mathematician who died in a mountain climbing accident
- (Gödel-Herbrand) computability thesis: before Church and Turing, in 1933 with Kurt Gödel, they created a formal definition of a class called general recursive functions.
