= Herbrand interpretation =

Simple logical interpretation

In mathematical logic, a Herbrand interpretation is an interpretation in which all constants and function symbols are assigned very simple meanings. Specifically, every constant is interpreted as itself, and every function symbol is interpreted as the application function on terms. The interpretation also defines predicate symbols as denoting a subset of the relevant Herbrand base, effectively specifying which ground atoms are true in the interpretation. This allows the symbols in a set of clauses to be interpreted in a purely syntactic way, separated from any real instantiation.

The importance of Herbrand interpretations is that, if there exists an interpretation that satisfies a given set of clauses S then there is a Herbrand interpretation that satisfies the clauses. Moreover, Herbrand's theorem states that if S is unsatisfiable then there is a finite unsatisfiable set of ground instances from the Herbrand universe defined by S. Since this set is finite, its unsatisfiability can be verified in finite time. However, there may be an infinite number of such sets to check.

Herbrand interpretations are named after Jacques Herbrand.

== See also ==
- Herbrand structure
- Interpretation (logic)
- Interpretation (model theory)
