= Louis Miles Muggleton =

British physicist and electrical engineer

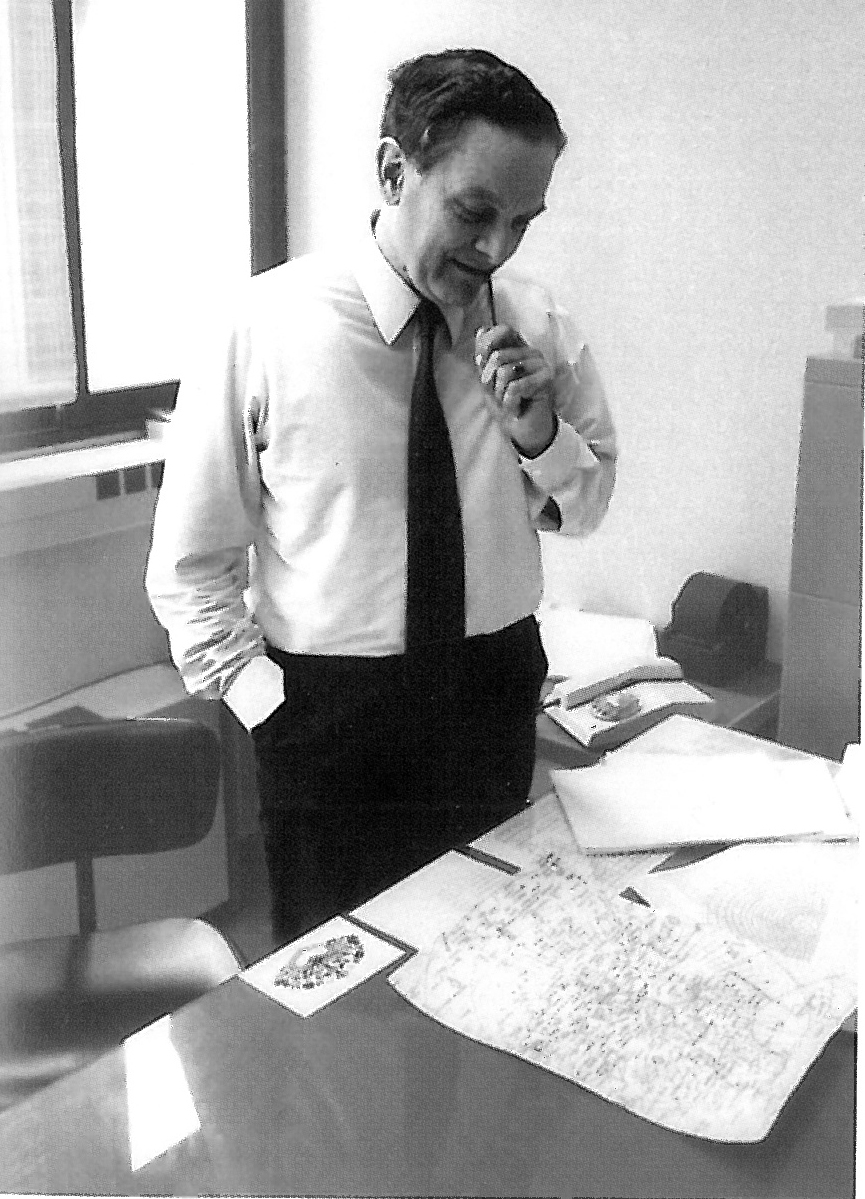
- Born: Louis Miles Muggleton; 8 July 1922; Sterkstroom, Cape Province, South Africa
- Died: 5 April 2015 (aged 92); Exeter, Devon
- Education: University of Cape Town
- Known for: Ionospheric Physics; Standard model of the Heaviside layer (or E-layer) of the Ionosphere
- Scientific career
- Fields: Physics and Electrical Engineering
- Workplaces: University of Edinburgh; University of Rhodesia; University of Exeter

Louis Miles Muggleton, FIET (8 July 1922 – 5 April 2015) was a South African-born British Ionospheric Physicist and Electrical Engineer. Building on the work of Sir Edward Appleton in 1975 Muggleton's seminal work provided the international standard ITU model of radio wave absorption and reflection of the Heaviside layer (or E-layer) of the Ionosphere. This model was based on jointly published work with Stamatis Kouris from the early 1970s.

== Biography ==
Louis Muggleton was born in Sterkstroom, South Africa, the son of Oscar Muggleton and Ethel Helen Eliza Verran. Educated at Umtali High School in Southern Rhodesia, in 1940 he was awarded a Beit Engineering Scholarship to the University of Cape Town where he graduated with a first class BSc degree in 1948. This was followed by a PhD in Antenna Design in 1960.

During the Second World War he joined the British Army, travelled to England, and transferred to the Royal Corps of Signals. Within a year he was promoted to lieutenant, in charge of a platoon. Trained to be involved in the D-Day landings, in 1944 he was posted to India for the remainder of the war. After the war, Muggleton returned to Southern Rhodesia where he was placed in charge of founding the Post Office Engineering College in 1950. In 1961, following an interchange of letters with Sir Edward Appleton, he was invited to take up a position on the staff of the Department of Electrical Engineering at the University of Edinburgh (1961-1973). At this time he began to provide technical assistance in short wave frequency selection and antenna design for Trans World Radio. In 1973 he returned to Africa to found the Faculty of Engineering at the University of Rhodesia, as a Professor and Dean of Faculty. Following serious injuries in a campus-based terrorist attack, he moved back to the UK in 1980, taking up a position as Director of the British Branch of Trans World Radio and overall Director of the Propagation Department. Muggleton retired to take up an honorary position at the University of Exeter in 1992.

He died in 2015 and was survived by his wife Sylvia (m. 1947) and sons John, Robert, Andrew and Stephen.

== Work ==
At the age of 20, interrupting a lecture during his signals training, Muggleton corrected an assertion about limits of the reflective nature of the ionosphere. He was asked to prove his claim to a group of British Army generals and succeeded in demonstrating Appleton's theoretical prediction that radio signals could be reflected from the Heaviside layer of the ionosphere even when transmitted vertically. His demonstration went on to be significant in its use for troop communications between the fjords in the Allied liberation of Norway during the winter of 1944-1945.

In work published in 1968 and 1969 Muggleton studied long-term oscillatory variations in the relationship between F-region ionization and visible solar activity. In these studies he showed that a dominant component was a cosine term of period equal to four sunspot cycles. The last crossing of the zero line was shown to have occurred during the 1947–1948 sunspot maximum, making that epoch of importance to statistical methods designed to remove this secular variation from ionospheric studies.

In an extension of this work in 1971 Muggleton showed that the regression coefficients between E-region peak electron density, $N_m(E)$, and sunspot number, $R$, depend on the particular solar cycle investigated. He found that a representative worldwide relationship for the 1949–1959 solar cycle, is given, by $N_M(E) = k_1(f_0 E)^2 = k_2(1+0.00334R)$ where $f_0 E$ is the critical frequency of the Heaviside layer and $k_1,k_2$ are constants.

In 1973 using $f_0 E$ and data from a period of 11 years, from 45 ionospheric stations, Muggleton and Kouris, his PhD student, investigated the value of the diurnal exponent $p$ in the expression $(f_0 E)^4 = A(cos \chi)^p$ where $\chi$ is the solar zenith angle and $p$ is the diurnal exponent. They found that firstly the value of $p$ does not vary with season and that secondly it does not exhibit any systematic variation with the latitude of the station. In a related article in 1973 they investigated the world morphology of the Appleton E-layer seasonal anomaly and showed that it depends not only on latitude but also on longitude and hemisphere. They suggested that the anomaly could be the result of seasonal variations in the Sq current system.

Later in 1974 together they went on to conduct a statistical investigation of the variation of E-region critical frequency $f_0 E$ with solar activity, solar zenith angle and season, to obtain a describing function of $f_0 E$ in terms of geographic latitude, solar zenith angle and 10.7 cm solar radio-noise flux, for the design of ionospheric transmission paths. The reliability of the $f_0 E$ expression was assessed by comparing predicted and observed values at various stations worldwide.

In 1975 Muggleton's seminal work was accepted by the ITU in Geneva as the internationally accepted model of absorption and reflection of the E-layer.

== Awards ==
- Fellow of the Institution of Engineering and Technology (1975)

== See also ==
- Sporadic E propagation
- Journal of Atmospheric and Terrestrial Physics, founded by Edward Appleton
