= Stephen Muggleton =

Artificial intelligence researcher (born 1959)

Professor Stephen Muggleton FBCS FIET FREng FAAAI
- Muggleton in 2010
- Born: 6 December 1959 (age 66)
- Education: University of Edinburgh
- Known for: Inductive logic programming; Robot Scientist
- Awards: FREng; FBCS; FIET; FAAAI
- Scientific career
- Fields: Inductive Logic Programming; Automation of Science; Relational Learning; Computational Logic; Logic Programming
- Workplaces: Nanjing University; Imperial College London; University of Oxford; Turing Institute; University of York
- Thesis: Inductive acquisition of expert knowledge (1987)
- Doctoral advisor: Donald Michie
- Website: www.doc.ic.ac.uk/~shm

Stephen H. Muggleton (born 6 December 1959, son of Louis Muggleton) is Professor of Machine Learning and Head of the Computational Bioinformatics Laboratory at Imperial College London.

== Education ==
Muggleton received his Bachelor of Science degree in computer science (1982) and Doctor of Philosophy in artificial intelligence (1986) supervised by Donald Michie at the University of Edinburgh.

== Career ==
Following his PhD, Muggleton went on to work as a postdoctoral research associate at the Turing Institute in Glasgow (1987–1991) and later an EPSRC Advanced Research Fellow at Oxford University Computing Laboratory (OUCL) (1992–1997) where he founded the Machine Learning Group. In 1997 he moved to the University of York and in 2001 to Imperial College London. From 2025, Muggleton has joined Nanjing University as a full-time professor.

== Research ==
Muggleton's research interests are primarily in Artificial intelligence. From 1997 to 2001 he held the Chair of Machine Learning at the University of York and from 2001 to 2006 the EPSRC Chair of Computational Bioinformatics at Imperial College in London. Since 2013 he holds the Syngenta/Royal Academy of Engineering Research Chair as well as the post of Director of Modelling for the Imperial College Centre for Integrated Systems Biology. He is known for founding the field of Inductive logic programming. In this field he has made contributions to theory introducing predicate invention, inverse entailment and stochastic logic programs. He has also played a role in systems development where he was instrumental in the systems Duce, Cigol, Golem, Progol and Metagol and applications – especially biological prediction tasks.

He worked on a Robot Scientist together with Ross D. King that is capable of combining Inductive Logic Programming with active learning. His present work concentrates on the development of Meta-Interpretive Learning, a new form of Inductive Logic Programming which supports predicate invention and learning of recursive programs.
