= Knowledge compilation =

AI methods

Knowledge compilation is a family of approaches for addressing the intractability of a number of artificial intelligence problems.

A propositional model is compiled in an off-line phase in order to support some queries in polynomial time. Many ways of compiling a propositional model exist.

Different compiled representations have different properties. The three main properties are:

- The compactness of the representation
- The queries that are supported in polynomial time
- The transformations of the representations that can be performed in polynomial time

== Classes of representations ==
Some examples of diagram classes include decision trees, OBDDs, FBDDs, and non-deterministic OBDDs, as well as MDD.

Some examples of formula classes include DNF and CNF.

Examples of circuit classes include NNF, DNNF, d-DNNF, and SDD.

== Knowledge compilers ==
- c2d: supports compilation to d-DNNF
- d4: supports compilation to d-DNNF
- miniC2D: supports compilation to SDD
- KCBox: supports compilation to OBDD, OBDD[AND], and CCDD
