= Herbrandization =

Proof of Herbrand's theorem

The Herbrandization of a logical formula (named after Jacques Herbrand) is a construction that is dual to the Skolemization of a formula. Thoralf Skolem had considered the Skolemizations of formulas in prenex form as part of his proof of the Löwenheim–Skolem theorem (Skolem 1920). Herbrand worked with this dual notion of Herbrandization, generalized to apply to non-prenex formulas as well, in order to prove Herbrand's theorem (Herbrand 1930).

The resulting formula is not necessarily equivalent to the original one. As with Skolemization, which only preserves satisfiability, Herbrandization being Skolemization's dual preserves validity: the resulting formula is valid if and only if the original one is.

== Definition and examples ==
Let $F$ be a formula in the language of first-order logic. We may assume that $F$ contains no variable that is bound by two different quantifier occurrences, and that no variable occurs both bound and free. (That is, $F$ could be relettered to ensure these conditions, in such a way that the result is an equivalent formula).

The Herbrandization of $F$ is then obtained as follows:

- First, replace any free variables in $F$ by constant symbols.
- Second, delete all quantifiers on variables that are either (1) universally quantified and within an even number of negation signs, or (2) existentially quantified and within an odd number of negation signs.
- Finally, replace each such variable $v$ with a function symbol $f_v(x_1,\dots,x_k)$, where $x_1,\dots,x_k$ are the variables that are still quantified, and whose quantifiers govern $v$.

For instance, consider the formula $F := \forall y \exists x [R(y,x) \wedge \neg\exists z S(x,z)]$. There are no free variables to replace. The variables $y,z$ are the kind we consider for the second step, so we delete the quantifiers $\forall y$ and $\exists z$. Finally, we then replace $y$ with a constant $c_y$ (since there were no other quantifiers governing $y$), and we replace $z$ with a function symbol $f_z(x)$:

$$F^H = \exists x [R(c_y,x) \wedge \neg S(x,f_z(x))].$$

The Skolemization of a formula is obtained similarly, except that in the second step above, we would delete quantifiers on variables that are either (1) existentially quantified and within an even number of negations, or (2) universally quantified and within an odd number of negations. Thus, considering the same $F$ from above, its Skolemization would be:

$$F^S = \forall y [R(y,f_x(y)) \wedge \neg\exists z S(f_x(y),z)].$$

To understand the significance of these constructions, see Herbrand's theorem or the Löwenheim–Skolem theorem.

== See also ==
- Predicate functor logic
