= Alef Network =

Defunct Argentine Jewish cable television channel

Alef Network was an Argentine cable television channel catering to the Jewish population. Founded in 1995, it was available on the cable networks of Buenos Aires until its closure in 2001, which was caused by the Argentine financial crisis. It was founded by Horacio Lutzky.

== History ==
Alef Network was established in mid-1994 by a group of fifteen Argentine-Jewish investors, employing local and Israeli media professionals, and received approval from the authorities to begin operations in April 1995. The initial plan outlined a schedule in which two-thirds of its output would be sourced from Israeli television networks, either through original production or acquired content.

Carlos Gurovich of Channel 2 oversaw its operations from Israel. The remaining third of its output was produced at its facilities in Buenos Aires. In addition to programming from Israel, the channel planned to air Arab programming, from Egypt, which had a substantial amount of television production, and the Palestinian productions. It started with an initial investment of US$3 million, but operational costs were low, as most of the programming was imported and had to be dubbed or subtitled.

The channel initially had a ten-hour schedule, which increased to eighteen hours. It secured sponsors, such as Visa, Banco Mayo, and wireless operator Movicom. Plans were made to expand to a full-day service (24 hours) by April 1996, and short-term plans involved the expansion of the channel to Chile, Uruguay, Peru, Bolivia, and southern Brazil. By the end of 1996, the channel aimed to cover eighteen countries in Latin America. Banco Mayo helped fund the channel.

When Cablevisión refused to renew its contract with HBO and Cinemax, as part of a series of changes to its line-up in January 1999, the channel moved from channel 63 to off-air slots occupied by Azul Televisión. The measure was criticized by the channel's staff, who was concerned about moving to a daypart where viewing was low. By December 1999, the channel had changed its identity, aiming to cater to a wider demographic.

The company was dissolved on March 23, 2001.
