= Aleph Melbourne =

Australian Jewish LGBTQ organization

- Established: January 1995
- Location: Melbourne, Australia
- Manager: Michael Barnett

Aleph Melbourne is a Jewish LGBTQ organization located in Melbourne, Australia.

== History ==
Aleph Melbourne was founded in January 1995 for gay Jewish men. In the late 1990s bisexual men were also welcomed as members. In 2007 the group became inclusive of LGBTIQ Jews, families and allies.

Aleph attempted to join the Jewish Community Council of Victoria (JCCV) in 1999, but was denied acceptance when Orthodox synagogues threatened to quit the JCCV if Aleph was permitted to join.

In 2015 the group celebrated their 20th anniversary by creating a documentary about themselves called "Aleph Melbourne- Celebrating 20 Years." The documentary was screened at the St Kilda Film Festival, the North Brisbane Film Festival, the Respect Belfast Human Rights Film Festival, the Santa Barbara Jewish Film Festival, and the Brooklyn My True Colors Festival.

== Events and services ==
=== Religious services ===
Aleph Melbourne is primarily secular, but has hosted services and dinners for major Jewish holidays like Passover and Rosh Hashanah. The group has also celebrated Hannukah with other members of the Melbourne community.

Aleph Melbourne and its coordinator Michael Barnett also speak out to end homophobia in the Jewish community across Melbourne and Australia.

=== Pride March ===
Aleph Melbourne has participated in Melbourne's Pride festival "Midsumma" every year since 1997. In 2016, the group excluded themselves after the festival made a financial partnership with News Corp, which Aleph Melbourne believed had supported homophobic journalists.

=== Political involvement ===
Aleph Melbourne created and distributed Voters Guides for the 2013, 2016, 2019 and 2022 federal elections, the 2018 and 2022 Victorian state elections and the 2020 Melbourne City Council election, covering voting areas with large Jewish populations. These guides presented political candidates' views on LGBTQ issues, including same-sex marriage.
