= Herbrand structure =

Structure over a vocabulary defined solely by syntactical properties

In first-order logic, a Herbrand structure $S$ is a structure over a vocabulary $\sigma$ (also sometimes called a signature) that is defined solely by the syntactical properties of $\sigma$. The idea is to take the symbol strings of terms as their values, e.g. the denotation of a constant symbol $c$ is just "$c$" (the symbol). It is named after Jacques Herbrand.

Herbrand structures play an important role in the foundations of logic programming.

== Herbrand universe ==
=== Definition ===
The Herbrand universe serves as the universe in a Herbrand structure.

1. The Herbrand universe of a first-order language $L^\sigma$, is the set of all ground terms of $L^\sigma$. If the language has no constants, then the language is extended by adding an arbitrary new constant.
  - The Herbrand universe is countably infinite if $\sigma$ is countable and a function symbol of arity greater than 0 exists.
  - In the context of first-order languages we also speak simply of the Herbrand universe of the vocabulary $\sigma$.
2. The Herbrand universe of a closed formula in Skolem normal form $F$ is the set of all terms without variables that can be constructed using the function symbols and constants of $F$. If $F$ has no constants, then $F$ is extended by adding an arbitrary new constant.
  - This second definition is important in the context of computational resolution.

=== Example ===
Let $L^\sigma$, be a first-order language with the vocabulary

- constant symbols: $c$
- function symbols: $f(\cdot), \, g(\cdot)$

then the Herbrand universe $H$ of $L^\sigma$ (or of $\sigma$) is

$H = \{ c, f(c), g(c), f(f(c)), f(g(c)), g(f(c)), g(g(c)), \dots\}$

The relation symbols are not relevant for a Herbrand universe since formulas involving only relations do not correspond to elements of the universe.

== Herbrand structure ==
A Herbrand structure interprets terms on top of a Herbrand universe.

=== Definition ===
Let $S$ be a structure, with vocabulary $\sigma$ and universe $U$. Let $W$ be the set of all terms over $\sigma$ and $W_0$ be the subset of all variable-free terms. $S$ is said to be a Herbrand structure iff

1. $U = W_0$
2. $f^S(t_1,\dots,t_n) = f(t_1,\dots,t_n)$ for every $n$-ary function symbol $f \in \sigma$ and $t_1,\dots,t_n \in W_0$
3. $c^S = c$ for every constant $c$ in $\sigma$

=== Remarks ===
1. $U$ is the Herbrand universe of $\sigma$.
2. A Herbrand structure that is a model of a theory $T$ is called a Herbrand model of $T$.

=== Examples ===
For a constant symbol $c$ and a unary function symbol $f(\,\cdot\,)$ we have the following interpretation:

- $U = \{c, fc, ffc, fffc, \dots\}$
- $fc \mapsto fc, ffc \mapsto ffc, \dots$
- $c \mapsto c$

== Herbrand base ==
In addition to the universe, defined in § Herbrand universe, and the term denotations, defined in § Herbrand structure, the Herbrand base completes the interpretation by denoting the relation symbols.

=== Definition ===
A Herbrand base $\mathcal B_H$ for a Herbrand structure is the set of all atomic formulas whose argument terms are elements of the Herbrand universe.

=== Examples ===
For a binary relation symbol $R$, we get with the terms from above:

$$\mathcal B_H = \{R(c,c), R(fc,c), R(c,fc), R(fc,fc), R(ffc,c), \dots\}$$

== See also ==
- Herbrand's theorem
- Herbrandization
- Herbrand interpretation
