= Aleph (pianist) =

Lebanese pianist

Fady "Aleph" Abi Saad
- Born: Fady Abi Saad; June 7, 1980 (age 46); Ehmej, Lebanon
- Genres: Oriental fusion, tango, flamenco, Latin, jazz, jazz fusion, world
- Occupations: Musician, composer, arranger
- Instrument: Pianist
- Years active: 1998–present
- Website: alephabisaad.com

Fady Abi Saad (Arabic: فادي أبي سعد; born June 7, 1980), better known by his stage name Aleph, is a Lebanese pianist, composer, arranger and entrepreneur. He is the owner and Art Director of 8ͤ Art Entertainment.

== Background and education ==
Aleph was born in Ehmej, Lebanon. He discovered music at the age of 3 when he was given a small old wooden piano. Reconstructing familiar tunes from such an early age, he was able to grasp occidental melodies while oriental tunes eluded him. He persevered and finally discovered what was missing: the "quarter tone", a basis of oriental music. His parents who saw his potential finally got him his first "real" piano.

Passionate about sounds, Aleph wanted to express Oriental melodies through an Occidental instrument, the piano, with no artifice or subterfuge. During the Lebanese Civil War, Aleph and his family left their hometown for the mountains to seek peace. Aleph spent all of his time in his uncle's studio. His uncle Michael Ramia is a composer who plays more than 8 instruments and has been a great influence on him. His days were dedicated to singing with his cousin Carla Ramia.

At the age of 11, Aleph started composing his own music.

Aleph Graduated in 1999 from Collège Saint Joseph – Antoura. In order to perfect his technique he enrolled in Holy Spirit University of Kaslik (in French: Université Saint-Esprit de Kaslik) (USEK) and studied piano theory and harmony. Aleph graduated as valedictorian n Music Theory from Kaslik and in Music Listening and Harmony from the Kharkiv Conservatory.

Even though Aleph is self-taught, he gracefully acknowledges that his "academic detours" have provided his art with the necessary classical and technical basis.

At 14, he gave his first solo concert, playing Chopin's Mazurkas in his own arrangement. and at the age of 18, gave a concert in his college theatre (College St Joseph Aintoura) where he performed his own compositions.

== Career ==
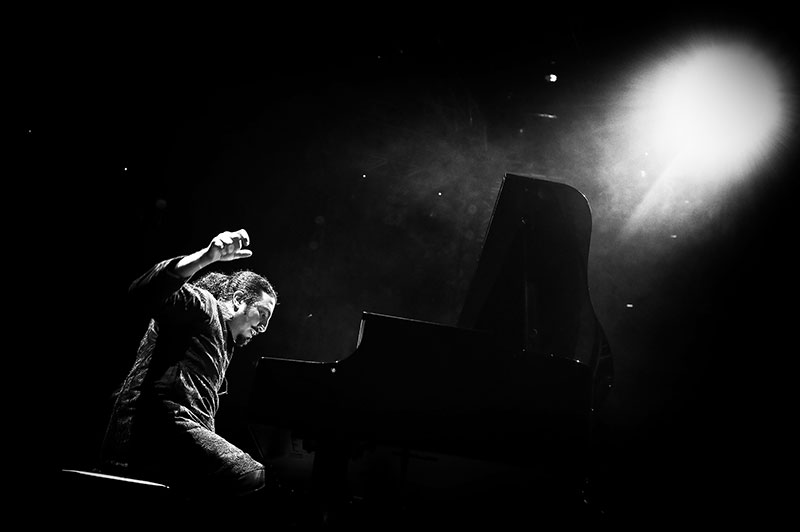
AlephDedication's Concert July 2013

At the age of 18, a friend introduced him to Elef Productions, a former Warner Music Group label. Right from the start, Michel Elefteriades saw his uniqueness and started working with him on a solo project.

In 2001, at only 21 years old, Aleph "Le Piano de l'Orient", was chosen to head the show for three consecutive days at the Byblos international Festival, – Mediterraneo, a stepping stone for his international career, beginning with a North African Tour in collaboration with his long time friend Michel Labex Labaki. After that came the collaborations with artists such as: EL Chato, Isabelle Laroche, Damien Barneata, Jose Fernandez, Demis Roussos, Peggy Pavlakis, Selim Sesler, Relou Mirea, Son Cubano, Tino Favazza, Tony Hanna, Wadih el Safi, The Greeks vs. Turkish, Oriental Roots Orchestra, Yugoslavian Brass Band...

In 2003 while performing, he caught the eye of a representative of the esteemed Steinway Pianos and became one of the Steinway Artists. Working with Elef Productions, he was part of the opening team of the Music Hall located in the city center of Beirut, Lebanon. Being the main pianist and arranger of the Music Hall musical acts up until 2006, he focused not only on world fusion music but also pop, ethnic, Bel canto and many other genres.

From 2002 till 2004 he worked on his first album Baladi that was going to be produced by Elef Productions. They worked at Georges El Safi Studios in Jdeideh and Raymond Khalife Studios in Ballouneh. The album originally included traditional Lebanese songs fused with non-oriental music. Unfortunately the album was not released due to contract disputes.

After that Aleph fully dedicated himself to 8e Art Entertainment, an entertainment company he founded with his brother Pierre Abi Saad in 2003. As 8e Art's Art Director, Aleph created and managed many groups of different styles such as Aleph's Big Band, The 8e Art Parade, Dia Quintet, L'Orient Andalou, The Lounge Hank, Big R Abian, 8 Rox, Screen Legends, Loud Arabia, X Band, 8 Walks, Kanj Workshop, The Brain, The Redz, The Classical Tribute, Vertical orchestra etc. These groups have participated in both local and international events and concerts. The Lounge Hank and Aleph also work in the TV business being the musicians of the well-known Arabic version of This Is How We Sing (Arabic: هيك منغنّي or Heik Menghanni) on Lebanese Murr Television (MTV), a prime time show aired on the station on Saturday nights.

=== Works ===
Aleph recorded his first single "Vaya Maria" which he composed after the birth of his daughter Vaya. The song also appeared on Michel Labex Labaki first album Bass which was presented at the Namm show 2012.

In 2014, Aleph began recording songs, which he composed and arranged, for his new album at Musigrama Estudios Madrid in October 2014, these songs featured well-known Spanish artists, Antonio Serrano, Jose Luis Lopez Fernandez (cello), Yelsy Heredia, Paquito Gonzalez amongst others. Aleph is also the Editor in Chief of WeConfess Magazine. based on music events and artists of the 8e Art Roster.

Aleph's company, 8e Art Entertainment, in collaboration with Bacchus Production, the leading event lighting experts & suppliers in the country, created two editions of the very successful local concerts; Dedications (I & II).

Aleph held a solo concert at the prestigious Olympia in Paris on May 28, 2016. The concert was Sold out bringing together people from all over the world. After the success of Aleph's concert in Paris. The show returned due to popular demand. The concert was held on home soil on July 3 at the Dbayeh International Festival in Lebanon.

Aleph took part in the Musiques Epicees Festival in France on the August 4 & 5. He was accompanied on stage by several French instrumentalists to a crowd of 3000 people at Saint-Aulaye. Presenting a special collection of tunes, from oriental to Latin, and a fusion of both, Latin-Oriental.

Aleph went to Prague, Czech Republic to record and film his music with the City of Prague Philharmonic Orchestra. Aleph has now completed the recording of his tracks at the Smecky Studios, and is set to release them to the public soon.

Aleph's latest work 'Radio at the Symphony, was showcased for the first time at the sold-out concert at the Ghalboun International Festival on June 28, 2018, with the backing of 80 international artists, musicians & the Lebanese Symphonic Orchestra. The concert has been praised by local publications for its ingenuity and uniqueness. Aleph now plans to take this concept 'Radio at the Symphony' to Europe for his upcoming tour.

On August 24, 2019, Aleph Abi Saad again headlined a European concert in Europe to a full crowd, The Suoni Dal Golfo festival in Lerici, Italy, accompanied by the Excellence Orchestra led by conductor Gianluca Marcianò.

== Discography ==
Aleph

Live album by Aleph
- Released: May 28, 2016
- Recorded: October 2014 – May 2015
- Genres: World music, Jazz fusion, instrumental
- Labels: i8 Production, Musigrama
- Producer: Abbey Road Studios

Singles from Aleph
- 1. "Into the Rain" Released: October 16, 2014; 2. "Une Valse Manouche" Released: October 17, 2014

Aleph Live is the debut album by Aleph, released on May 28, 2016. The Album was recorded at the Musigrama Studios in Madrid, Spain, and Mastered by Abbey Road Studios. Featuring prominent Spanish Instrumentalists such as Antonio Serrano, Yelsy Heredia, Diego Galaz, Pablo Martin Carminero among others.

=== Track listing ===
No.	Title	Length
1.	"Into the rain" (recorded October 2014 – May 2015)	5:31
2.	"Une Valse Manouche" (recorded October 2014 – May 2015)	4:48
3.	"Rumbeando en Madrid" (recorded October 2014 – May 2015)	4:03
4.	"Plus jamais" (recorded October 2014 – May 2015)	4:58
5.	"Midlife feat. Carmina Cortez" (recorded October 2014 – May 2015)	3:17
6.	"7.20 am" (recorded October 2014 – May 2015)	4:31
7.	"La princesse au diamant poli" (recorded October 2014 – May 2015)	5:56
8.	"Morning mist" (recorded October 2014 – May 2015)	3:38
9.	"Hope and regret" (recorded October 2014 – May 2015)	3:29
10.	"March 13" (recorded October 2014 – May 2015 (Bonus track))	4:46

=== Activism and ideologies ===
Aleph is a supporter of many charity associations. He has participated in the organizing of many fund raising events for the Lebanese Red Cross, The Children Cancer Center, Tamana, Em el Nour, Teach a Child, Rotary, Wille the Clown, Anta Akhi and many others.

In 2014 he founded "Les Pianos du Coeur". It brings together pianists from all over the world to share a stage. The goal of this project is to finally offer all the funds to a non-profit organization. Each year the funds will be given to a different charity organization.
