= Aleph (journal) =

- Subject: Jewish history, history of science
- Language: English
- Edited by: Reimund Leicht; Resianne Fontaine

Publication details
- History: 2001–present
- Publisher: Indiana University Press

Standard abbreviations
- ISO 4: Aleph

Indexing
- ISSN: 1565-1525 (print); 1553-3956 (web)

Links
- Journal homepage; JSTOR; Project MUSE

Aleph: Historical Studies in Science & Judaism is a peer-reviewed academic journal on Jewish history and the history of science. It is published by Indiana University Press in conjunction with the Sidney M. Edelstein Center for the History and Philosophy of Science, Technology and Medicine at the Hebrew University of Jerusalem. It began publication in 2001; the founding editor was Gad Freudenthal. As of 2020, Reimund Leicht and Resianne Fontaine serve as co-editors.

== Abstracting and indexing ==
Aleph is indexed in:

- Academic Search Premier
- Arts and Humanities Citation Index
- ATLA Religion Database
- Humanities Abstracts
- IBZ Online
- Index Islamicus
- Jewish Studies Source
- Modern Language Association Database
- Scopus
