= Ground expression =

Term that does not contain any variables

In mathematical logic, a ground term of a formal system is a term that does not contain any variables. Similarly, a ground formula is a formula that does not contain any variables.

In first-order logic with identity with constant symbols $a$ and $b$, the sentence $Q(a) \lor P(b)$ is a ground formula. A ground expression is a ground term or ground formula.

== Examples ==
Consider the following expressions in first order logic over a signature containing the constant symbols $0$ and $1$ for the numbers 0 and 1, respectively, a unary function symbol $s$ for the successor function and a binary function symbol $+$ for addition.

- $s(0), s(s(0)), s(s(s(0))), \ldots$ are ground terms;
- $0 + 1, \; 0 + 1 + 1, \ldots$ are ground terms;
- $0+s(0), \; s(0)+ s(0), \; s(0)+s(s(0))+0$ are ground terms;
- $x + s(1)$ and $s(x)$ are terms, but not ground terms;
- $s(0) = 1$ and $0 + 0 = 0$ are ground formulae.

== Formal definitions ==
What follows is a formal definition for first-order languages. Let a first-order language be given, with $C$ the set of constant symbols, $F$ the set of functional operators, and $P$ the set of predicate symbols.

=== Ground term ===
A ground term is a term that contains no variables. Ground terms may be defined by logical recursion (formula-recursion):

1. Elements of $C$ are ground terms;
2. If $f \in F$ is an $n$-ary function symbol and $\alpha_1, \alpha_2, \ldots, \alpha_n$ are ground terms, then $f\left(\alpha_1, \alpha_2, \ldots, \alpha_n\right)$ is a ground term.
3. Every ground term can be given by a finite application of the above two rules (there are no other ground terms; in particular, predicates cannot be ground terms).

Roughly speaking, the Herbrand universe is the set of all ground terms.

=== Ground atom ===
A ground predicate, ground atom or ground literal is an atomic formula all of whose argument terms are ground terms.

If $p \in P$ is an $n$-ary predicate symbol and $\alpha_1, \alpha_2, \ldots, \alpha_n$ are ground terms, then $p\left(\alpha_1, \alpha_2, \ldots, \alpha_n\right)$ is a ground predicate or ground atom.

Roughly speaking, the Herbrand base is the set of all ground atoms, while a Herbrand interpretation assigns a truth value to each ground atom in the base.

=== Ground formula ===
A ground formula or ground clause is a formula without variables.

Ground formulas may be defined by syntactic recursion as follows:

1. A ground atom is a ground formula.
2. If $\varphi$ and $\psi$ are ground formulas, then $\lnot \varphi$, $\varphi \lor \psi$, and $\varphi \land \psi$ are ground formulas.

Ground formulas are a particular kind of closed formulas.

== See also ==
- Open formula – Formula that contains at least one free variable
- Sentence (mathematical logic) – In mathematical logic, a well-formed formula with no free variables
