= Admissible rule =

In logic, a rule of inference is admissible in a formal system if the set of theorems of the system does not change when that rule is added to the existing rules of the system. In other words, every formula that can be derived using that rule is already derivable without that rule, so, in a sense, it is redundant. The concept of an admissible rule was introduced by Paul Lorenzen (1955).

== Definitions ==
Admissibility has been systematically studied only in the case of structural (i.e. substitution-closed) rules in propositional non-classical logics, which we will describe next.

Let a set of basic propositional connectives be fixed (for instance, $\{\to,\land,\lor,\bot\}$ in the case of superintuitionistic logics, or $\{\to,\bot,\Box\}$ in the case of monomodal logics). Well-formed formulas are built freely using these connectives from a countably infinite set of propositional variables p_{0}, p_{1}, .... A substitution σ is a function from formulas to formulas that commutes with applications of the connectives, i.e.,
$$\sigma f(A_1,\dots,A_n)=f(\sigma A_1,\dots,\sigma A_n)$$
for every connective f, and formulas A_{1}, ... , A_{n}. (We may also apply substitutions to sets Γ of formulas, making σΓ = {σA: A ∈ Γ}.) A Tarski-style consequence relation is a relation $\vdash$ between sets of formulas, and formulas, such that

1. $A\vdash A,$
2. if $\Gamma\vdash A$ then $\Gamma,\Delta\vdash A,$ ("weakening")
3. if $\Gamma\vdash A$ and $\Delta,A\vdash B$ then $\Gamma,\Delta\vdash B,$ ("composition")

for all formulas A, B, and sets of formulas Γ, Δ. A consequence relation such that

4. if $\Gamma\vdash A$ then $\sigma\Gamma\vdash\sigma A$

for all substitutions σ is called structural. (Note that the term "structural" as used here and below is unrelated to the notion of structural rules in sequent calculi.) A structural consequence relation is called a propositional logic. A formula A is a theorem of a logic $\vdash$ if $\varnothing\vdash A$.

For example, we identify a superintuitionistic logic L with its standard consequence relation $\vdash_L$ generated by modus ponens and axioms, and we identify a normal modal logic with its global consequence relation $\vdash_L$ generated by modus ponens, necessitation, and (as axioms) the theorems of the logic.

A structural inference rule (or just rule for short) is given by a pair (Γ, B), usually written as
$$\frac{A_1,\dots,A_n}B\qquad\text{or}\qquad A_1,\dots,A_n/B,$$
where Γ = {A_{1}, ... , A_{n}} is a finite set of formulas, and B is a formula. An instance of the rule is
$$\sigma A_1,\dots,\sigma A_n/\sigma B$$
for a substitution σ. The rule Γ/B is derivable in $\vdash$, if $\Gamma\vdash B$. It is admissible if for every instance of the rule, σB is a theorem whenever all formulas from σΓ are theorems. In other words, a rule is admissible if it, when added to the logic, does not lead to new theorems. We also write $\Gamma\mathrel{|\!\!\!\sim} B$ if Γ/B is admissible. (Note that $\phantom{.}\!{|\!\!\!\sim}$ is a structural consequence relation on its own.)

Every derivable rule is admissible, but not vice versa in general. A logic is structurally complete if every admissible rule is derivable, i.e., ${\vdash}={\,|\!\!\!\sim}$.

In logics with a well-behaved conjunction connective (such as superintuitionistic or modal logics), a rule $A_1,\dots,A_n/B$ is equivalent to $A_1\land\dots\land A_n/B$ with respect to admissibility and derivability. It is therefore customary to only deal with unary rules A/B.

== Examples ==
- Classical propositional calculus (CPC) is structurally complete. Indeed, assume that A/B is a non-derivable rule, and fix an assignment v such that v(A) = 1, and v(B) = 0. Define a substitution σ such that for every variable p, σp = $\top$ if v(p) = 1, and σp = $\bot$ if v(p) = 0. Then σA is a theorem, but σB is not (in fact, ¬σB is a theorem). Thus the rule A/B is not admissible either. (The same argument applies to any multi-valued logic L complete with respect to a logical matrix all of whose elements have a name in the language of L.)
- The Kreisel–Putnam rule (also known as Harrop's rule, or independence of premise rule)
  $$(\mathit{KPR})\qquad\frac{\neg p\to q\lor r}{(\neg p\to q)\lor(\neg p\to r)}$$
  is admissible in the intuitionistic propositional calculus (IPC). In fact, it is admissible in every superintuitionistic logic. On the other hand, the formula
  $$(\neg p\to q\lor r)\to ((\neg p\to q)\lor(\neg p\to r))$$
  is not an intuitionistic theorem; hence KPR is not derivable in IPC. In particular, IPC is not structurally complete.
- The rule
  $$\frac{\Box p}p$$
  is admissible in many modal logics, such as K, D, K4, S4, GL (see this table for names of modal logics). It is derivable in S4, but it is not derivable in K, D, K4, or GL.
- The rule
  $$\frac{\Diamond p\land\Diamond\neg p}\bot$$
  is admissible in normal logic $L \supseteq S4.3$. It is derivable in GL and S4.1, but it is not derivable in K, D, K4, S4, or S5.
- Löb's rule
  $$(\mathit{LR})\qquad\frac{\Box p\to p}p$$
  is admissible (but not derivable) in the basic modal logic K, and it is derivable in GL. However, LR is not admissible in K4. In particular, it is not true in general that a rule admissible in a logic L must be admissible in its extensions.
- The Gödel–Dummett logic (LC), and the modal logic Grz.3 are structurally complete. The product fuzzy logic is also structurally complete.

== Decidability and reduced rules ==
The basic question about admissible rules of a given logic is whether the set of all admissible rules is decidable. Note that the problem is nontrivial even if the logic itself (i.e., its set of theorems) is decidable: the definition of admissibility of a rule A/B involves an unbounded universal quantifier over all propositional substitutions. Hence a priori we only know that admissibility of rule in a decidable logic is $\Pi^0_1$ (i.e., its complement is recursively enumerable). For instance, it is known that admissibility in the bimodal logics K_{u} and K4_{u} (the extensions of K or K4 with the universal modality) is undecidable. Remarkably, decidability of admissibility in the basic modal logic K is a major open problem.

Nevertheless, admissibility of rules is known to be decidable in many modal and superintuitionistic logics. The first decision procedures for admissible rules in basic transitive modal logics were constructed by Rybakov, using the reduced form of rules. A modal rule in variables p_{0}, ... , p_{k} is called reduced if it has the form
$$\frac{\bigvee_{i=0}^n\bigl(\bigwedge_{j=0}^k\neg_{i,j}^0p_j\land\bigwedge_{j=0}^k\neg_{i,j}^1\Box p_j\bigr)}{p_0},$$
where each $\neg_{i,j}^u$ is either blank, or negation $\neg$. For each rule r, we can effectively construct a reduced rule s (called the reduced form of r) such that any logic admits (or derives) r if and only if it admits (or derives) s, by introducing extension variables for all subformulas in A, and expressing the result in the full disjunctive normal form. It is thus sufficient to construct a decision algorithm for admissibility of reduced rules.

Let $\textstyle\bigvee_{i=0}^n\varphi_i/p_0$ be a reduced rule as above. We identify every conjunction $\varphi_i$ with the set $\{\neg_{i,j}^0p_j,\neg_{i,j}^1\Box p_j\mid j\le k\}$ of its conjuncts. For any subset W of the set $\{\varphi_i\mid i\le n\}$ of all conjunctions, let us define a Kripke model $M=\langle W,R,{\Vdash}\rangle$ by
$$\varphi_i\Vdash p_j\iff p_j\in\varphi_i,$$

$\varphi_i\,R\,\varphi_{i'}\iff\forall j\le k\,(\Box p_j\in\varphi_i\Rightarrow\{p_j,\Box p_j\}\subseteq\varphi_{i'}).$

Then the following provides an algorithmic criterion for admissibility in K4:

Theorem. The rule $\textstyle\bigvee_{i=0}^n\varphi_i/p_0$ is not admissible in K4 if and only if there exists a set $W\subseteq\{\varphi_i\mid i\le n\}$ such that

1. $\varphi_i\nVdash p_0$ for some $i\le n,$
2. $\varphi_i\Vdash\varphi_i$ for every $i\le n,$
3. for every subset D of W there exist elements $\alpha,\beta\in W$ such that the equivalences

$\alpha\Vdash\Box p_j$ if and only if $\varphi\Vdash p_j\land\Box p_j$ for every $\varphi\in D$
$\alpha\Vdash\Box p_j$ if and only if $\alpha\Vdash p_j$ and $\varphi\Vdash p_j\land\Box p_j$ for every $\varphi\in D$

$$\varphi_i\Vdash p_j\iff p_j\in\varphi_i,$$

Similar criteria can be found for the logics S4, GL, and Grz. Furthermore, admissibility in intuitionistic logic can be reduced to admissibility in Grz using the Gödel–McKinsey–Tarski translation:

$A\,|\!\!\!\sim_{IPC}B$ if and only if $T(A)\,|\!\!\!\sim_{Grz}T(B).$

Rybakov (1997) developed much more sophisticated techniques for showing decidability of admissibility, which apply to a robust (infinite) class of transitive (i.e., extending K4 or IPC) modal and superintuitionistic logics, including e.g. S4.1, S4.2, S4.3, KC, T_{k} (as well as the above-mentioned logics IPC, K4, S4, GL, Grz).

Despite being decidable, the admissibility problem has relatively high computational complexity, even in simple logics: admissibility of rules in the basic transitive logics IPC, K4, S4, GL, Grz is coNEXP-complete. This should be contrasted with the derivability problem (for rules or formulas) in these logics, which is PSPACE-complete.

== Projectivity and unification ==
Admissibility in propositional logics is closely related to unification in the equational theory of modal or Heyting algebras. The connection was developed by Ghilardi (1999, 2000). In the logical setup, a unifier of a formula A in the language of a logic L (an L-unifier for short) is a substitution σ such that σA is a theorem of L. (Using this notion, we can rephrase admissibility of a rule A/B in L as "every L-unifier of A is an L-unifier of B".) An L-unifier σ is less general than an L-unifier τ, written as σ ≤ τ, if there exists a substitution υ such that
$$\vdash_L\sigma p\leftrightarrow \upsilon\tau p$$
for every variable p. A complete set of unifiers of a formula A is a set S of L-unifiers of A such that every L-unifier of A is less general than some unifier from S. A most general unifier (MGU) of A is a unifier σ such that {σ} is a complete set of unifiers of A. It follows that if S is a complete set of unifiers of A, then a rule A/B is L-admissible if and only if every σ in S is an L-unifier of B. Thus we can characterize admissible rules if we can find well-behaved complete sets of unifiers.

An important class of formulas that have a most general unifier are the projective formulas: these are formulas A such that there exists a unifier σ of A such that
$$A\vdash_L B\leftrightarrow\sigma B$$
for every formula B. Note that σ is an MGU of A. In transitive modal and superintuitionistic logics with the finite model property, one can characterize projective formulas semantically as those whose set of finite L-models has the extension property: if M is a finite Kripke L-model with a root r whose cluster is a singleton, and the formula A holds at all points of M except for r, then we can change the valuation of variables in r so as to make A true at r as well. Moreover, the proof provides an explicit construction of an MGU for a given projective formula A.

In the basic transitive logics IPC, K4, S4, GL, Grz (and more generally in any transitive logic with the finite model property whose set of finite frame satisfies another kind of extension property), we can effectively construct for any formula A its projective approximation Π(A): a finite set of projective formulas such that

1. $P\vdash_L A$ for every $P\in\Pi(A),$
2. every unifier of A is a unifier of a formula from Π(A).

It follows that the set of MGUs of elements of Π(A) is a complete set of unifiers of A. Furthermore, if P is a projective formula, then

$P\,|\!\!\!\sim_L B$ if and only if $P\vdash_L B$

for any formula B. Thus we obtain the following effective characterization of admissible rules:

$A\,|\!\!\!\sim_L B$ if and only if $\forall P\in\Pi(A)\,(P\vdash_L B).$

== Bases of admissible rules ==
Let L be a logic. A set R of L-admissible rules is called a basis of admissible rules, if every admissible rule Γ/B can be derived from R and the derivable rules of L, using substitution, composition, and weakening. In other words, R is a basis if and only if $\phantom{.}\!{|\!\!\!\sim_L}$ is the smallest structural consequence relation that includes $\vdash_L$ and R.

Notice that decidability of admissible rules of a decidable logic is equivalent to the existence of recursive (or recursively enumerable) bases: on the one hand, the set of all admissible rules is a recursive basis if admissibility is decidable. On the other hand, the set of admissible rules is always co-recursively enumerable, and if we further have a recursively enumerable basis, set of admissible rules is also recursively enumerable; hence it is decidable. (In other words, we can decide admissibility of A/B by the following algorithm: we start in parallel two exhaustive searches, one for a substitution σ that unifies A but not B, and one for a derivation of A/B from R and $\vdash_L$. One of the searches has to eventually come up with an answer.) Apart from decidability, explicit bases of admissible rules are useful for some applications, e.g. in proof complexity.

For a given logic, we can ask whether it has a recursive or finite basis of admissible rules, and to provide an explicit basis. If a logic has no finite basis, it can nevertheless have an independent basis: a basis R such that no proper subset of R is a basis.

In general, very little can be said about existence of bases with desirable properties. For example, while tabular logics are generally well-behaved, and always finitely axiomatizable, there exist tabular modal logics without a finite or independent basis of rules. Finite bases are relatively rare: even the basic transitive logics IPC, K4, S4, GL, Grz do not have a finite basis of admissible rules, though they have independent bases.

=== Examples of bases ===
- The empty set is a basis of L-admissible rules if and only if L is structurally complete.
- Every extension of the modal logic S4.3 (including, notably, S5) has a finite basis consisting of the single rule

$$\frac{\Diamond p\land\Diamond\neg p}\bot.$$

- Visser's rules
  $$\frac{\displaystyle\Bigl(\bigwedge_{i=1}^n(p_i\to q_i)\to p_{n+1}\lor p_{n+2}\Bigr)\lor r}{\displaystyle\bigvee_{j=1}^{n+2}\Bigl(\bigwedge_{i=1}^{n}(p_i\to q_i)\to p_j\Bigr)\lor r},\qquad n\ge 1$$
  are a basis of admissible rules in IPC or KC.
- The rules
  $$\frac{\displaystyle\Box\Bigl(\Box q\to\bigvee_{i=1}^n\Box p_i\Bigr)\lor\Box r}{\displaystyle\bigvee_{i=1}^n\Box(q\land\Box q\to p_i)\lor r},\qquad n\ge0$$
  are a basis of admissible rules of GL. (Note that the empty disjunction is defined as $\bot$.)
- The rules
  $$\frac{\displaystyle\Box\Bigl(\Box(q\to\Box q)\to\bigvee_{i=1}^n\Box p_i\Bigr)\lor\Box r}{\displaystyle\bigvee_{i=1}^n\Box(\Box q\to p_i)\lor r},\qquad n\ge0$$
  are a basis of admissible rules of S4 or Grz.

== Semantics for admissible rules ==
A rule Γ/B is valid in a modal or intuitionistic Kripke frame $F=\langle W,R\rangle$, if the following is true for every valuation $\Vdash$ in F:

if for all $A\in\Gamma$ $\forall x\in W\,(x\Vdash A)$, then $\forall x\in W\,(x\Vdash B)$.

(The definition readily generalizes to general frames, if needed.)

Let X be a subset of W, and t a point in W. We say that t is

- a reflexive tight predecessor of X, if for every y in W: t R y if and only if t = y or for some x in X: x = y or x R y ,
- an irreflexive tight predecessor of X, if for every y in W: t R y if and only if for some x in X: x = y or x R y .

We say that a frame F has reflexive (irreflexive) tight predecessors, if for every finite subset X of W, there exists a reflexive (irreflexive) tight predecessor of X in W.

We have:

- a rule is admissible in IPC if and only if it is valid in all intuitionistic frames that have reflexive tight predecessors,
- a rule is admissible in K4 if and only if it is valid in all transitive frames that have reflexive and irreflexive tight predecessors,
- a rule is admissible in S4 if and only if it is valid in all transitive reflexive frames that have reflexive tight predecessors,
- a rule is admissible in GL if and only if it is valid in all transitive converse well-founded frames that have irreflexive tight predecessors.

Note that apart from a few trivial cases, frames with tight predecessors must be infinite. Hence admissible rules in basic transitive logics do not enjoy the finite model property.

== Structural completeness ==
While a general classification of structurally complete logics is not an easy task, we have a good understanding of some special cases.

Intuitionistic logic itself is not structurally complete, but its fragments may behave differently. Namely, any disjunction-free rule or implication-free rule admissible in a superintuitionistic logic is derivable. On the other hand, the Mints rule
$$\frac{(p\to q)\to p\lor r}{((p\to q)\to p)\lor((p\to q)\to r)}$$
is admissible in intuitionistic logic but not derivable, and contains only implications and disjunctions.

We know the maximal structurally incomplete transitive logics. A logic is called hereditarily structurally complete, if any extension is structurally complete. For example, classical logic, as well as the logics LC and Grz.3 mentioned above, are hereditarily structurally complete. A complete description of hereditarily structurally complete superintuitionistic and transitive modal logics was given respectively by Citkin and Rybakov. Namely, a superintuitionistic logic is hereditarily structurally complete if and only if it is not valid in any of the five Kripke frames

Similarly, an extension of K4 is hereditarily structurally complete if and only if it is not valid in any of certain twenty Kripke frames (including the five intuitionistic frames above).

There exist structurally complete logics that are not hereditarily structurally complete: for example, Medvedev's logic is structurally complete, but it is included in the structurally incomplete logic KC.

== Variants ==
A rule with parameters is a rule of the form
$$\frac{A(p_1,\dots,p_n,s_1,\dots,s_k)}{B(p_1,\dots,p_n,s_1,\dots,s_k)},$$
whose variables are divided into the "regular" variables p_{i}, and the parameters s_{i}. The rule is L-admissible if every L-unifier σ of A such that σs_{i} = s_{i} for each i is also a unifier of B. The basic decidability results for admissible rules also carry to rules with parameters.

A multiple-conclusion rule is a pair (Γ,Δ) of two finite sets of formulas, written as
$$\frac{A_1,\dots,A_n}{B_1,\dots,B_m}\qquad\text{or}\qquad A_1,\dots,A_n/B_1,\dots,B_m.$$
Such a rule is admissible if every unifier of Γ is also a unifier of some formula from Δ. For example, a logic L is consistent iff it admits the rule
$$\frac{\;\bot\;}{},$$
and a superintuitionistic logic has the disjunction property iff it admits the rule
$$\frac{p\lor q}{p,q}.$$
Again, basic results on admissible rules generalize smoothly to multiple-conclusion rules. In logics with a variant of the disjunction property, the multiple-conclusion rules have the same expressive power as single-conclusion rules: for example, in S4 the rule above is equivalent to
$$\frac{A_1,\dots,A_n}{\Box B_1\lor\dots\lor\Box B_m}.$$
Nevertheless, multiple-conclusion rules can often be employed to simplify arguments.

In proof theory, admissibility is often considered in the context of sequent calculi, where the basic objects are sequents rather than formulas. For example, one can rephrase the cut-elimination theorem as saying that the cut-free sequent calculus admits the cut rule
$$\frac{\Gamma\vdash A,\Delta\qquad\Pi,A\vdash\Lambda}{\Gamma,\Pi\vdash\Delta,\Lambda}.$$
(By abuse of language, it is also sometimes said that the (full) sequent calculus admits cut, meaning its cut-free version does.) However, admissibility in sequent calculi is usually only a notational variant for admissibility in the corresponding logic: any complete calculus for (say) intuitionistic logic admits a sequent rule if and only if IPC admits the formula rule that we obtain by translating each sequent $\Gamma\vdash\Delta$ to its characteristic formula $\bigwedge\Gamma\to\bigvee\Delta$.

== See also ==
- Extension by new constant and function names
- Conservative extension
