= Non-normal modal logic =

Less-restrictive form of modal logic

A non-normal modal logic is a variant of modal logic that deviates from the basic principles of normal modal logics.

Normal modal logics adhere to the distributivity axiom ($\Box (p \to q) \to (\Box p \to \Box q)$) and the necessitation principle which states that "a tautology must be necessarily true" ($\vdash A$ entails $\vdash \Box A$). On the other hand, non-normal modal logics do not always have such requirements. The minimal variant of non-normal modal logics is logic E, which contains the congruence rule in its Hilbert calculus or the E rule in its sequent calculus upon the corresponding proof systems for classical propositional logic. Additional axioms, namely axioms M, C and N, can be added to form stronger logic systems. With all three axioms added to logic E, a logic system equivalent to normal modal logic K is obtained.

Whilst Kripke semantics is the most common formal semantics for normal modal logics (e.g., logic K), non-normal modal logics are often interpreted with neighbourhood semantics.

== Syntax ==
The syntax of non-normal modal logic systems resembles that of normal modal logics, which is founded upon propositional logic. An atomic statement is represented with propositional variables (e.g., $p, q, r$); logical connectives include negation ($\neg$), conjunction ($\land$), disjunction ($\lor$) and implication ($\to$). The modalities are most commonly represented with the box ($\Box$) and the diamond ($\Diamond$).

A formal grammar for this syntax can minimally be defined using only the negation, disjunction and box symbols. In such a language, $\varphi, \psi := p\ |\ \neg\varphi\ |\ \Box\varphi\ |\ \varphi \lor \psi$ where $p$ is any propositional name. The conjunction $\varphi \land \psi$ may then be defined as equivalent to $\neg (\neg\varphi \lor \neg\psi)$. For any modal formula $\varphi$, the formula $\Diamond\varphi$ is defined by $\neg\Box\neg\varphi$. Alternatively, if the language is first defined with the diamond, then the box can be analogously defined by $\Box\varphi \equiv \neg\Diamond\neg\varphi$.

For any propositional name $p$, the formulae $p$ and $\neg p$ are considered propositional literals whilst $\Box p$ and $\neg\Box p$ are considered modal literals.

== Proof systems ==
Logic E, the minimal variant of non-normal modal logics, includes the RE congruence rule in its Hilbert calculus or the E rule in its sequent calculus.

=== Hilbert calculus ===
The Hilbert calculus for logic E is built upon the one for classical propositional logic with the congruence rule (RE): $\frac{A \leftrightarrow B}{\Box A \leftrightarrow \Box B}$. Alternatively, the rule can be defined by $\frac{A \leftrightarrow B}{\Diamond A \leftrightarrow \Diamond B}$. Logics containing this rule are called congruential.

=== Sequent calculus ===
The sequent calculus for logic E, another proof system that operates on sequents, consists of the inference rules for propositional logic and the E rule of inference: $\frac{A \vdash B \qquad B \vdash A}{\Gamma, \Box A \vdash \Box B, \Delta}$.

The sequent $\Gamma \vdash \Delta$ means $\Gamma$ entails $\Delta$, with $\Gamma$ being the antecedent (a conjunction of formulae as premises) and $\Delta$ being the precedent (a disjunction of formulae as the conclusion).

=== Resolution calculus ===
The resolution calculus for non-normal modal logics introduces the concept of global and local modalities. The formula $\mathsf{G}(\varphi)$ denotes the global modality of the modal formula $\varphi$, which means that $\varphi$ holds true in all worlds in a neighbourhood model. For logic E, the resolution calculus consists of LRES, GRES, G2L, LERES and GERES rules.

The LRES rule resembles the resolution rule for classical propositional logic, where any propositional literals $p$ and $\neg p$ are eliminated: $\frac{D \lor l \qquad D' \lor \neg l}{D \lor D'}$.

The LERES rule states that if two propositional names $p$ and $p'$ are equivalent, then $\Box p$ and $\neg\Box p'$ can be eliminated. The G2L rule states that any globally true formula is also locally true. The GRES and GERES inference rules, whilst variants of LRES and LERES, apply to formulae featuring the global modality.

Given any modal formula, the proving process with this resolution calculus is done by recursively renaming a complex modal formula as a propositional name and using the global modality to assert their equivalence.

== Semantics ==
Whilst Kripke semantics is often applied as the semantics of normal modal logics, the semantics of non-normal modal logics are commonly defined with neighbourhood models. A standard neighbourhood model $\mathcal{M}$ is defined with the triple $\langle \mathcal{W}, \mathcal{N}, \mathcal{V} \rangle$ where:

- $\mathcal{W}$ is a non-empty set of worlds.
- $\mathcal{N}: \mathcal{W} \to \mathcal{PP}(\mathcal{W})$ is the neighbourhood function that maps any world to a set of worlds. The function $\mathcal{P}$ denotes a power set.
- $\mathcal{V}: Atm \to \mathcal{P}(\mathcal{W})$ is the valuation function which, given any propositional name $p$, outputs a set of worlds where $p$ is true.

The semantics can be further generalised as bi-neighbourhood semantics.

== Additional axioms ==
The classical cube of non-normal modal logic considers axioms M, C and N that can be added to logic E defined as follows.

Additional axioms for non-normal modal logics
Axiom	Definition	Alternative definition	Corresponding neighbourhood semantics
M	$\Box (A \land B) \to \Box A$	$\Diamond A \to \Diamond (A \lor B)$	If $\alpha \in \mathcal{N}(w)$ and $\alpha \subseteq \beta$, then $\beta \in \mathcal{N}(w)$.
C	$\Box A \land \Box B \to \Box (A \land B)$	$\Diamond (A \lor B) \to \Diamond A \lor \Diamond B$	If $\alpha, \beta \in \mathcal{N}(w)$, then $\alpha \cap \beta \in \mathcal{N}(w)$.
N	$\Box\top$	$\neg\Diamond\bot$	$\mathcal{W} \in \mathcal{N}(w)$.

A logic system containing axiom M is monotonic. With axioms M and C, the logic system is regular. Including all three axioms, the logic system is normal.

With these axioms, additional rules are included in their proof systems accordingly.
