= Sahlqvist formula =

Certain kind of modal formula

In modal logic, Sahlqvist formulas are a certain kind of modal formula with remarkable properties. The Sahlqvist correspondence theorem states that every Sahlqvist formula is canonical, and corresponds to a class of Kripke frames definable by a first-order formula.

Sahlqvist's definition characterizes a decidable set of modal formulas with first-order correspondents. Since it is undecidable, by Chagrova's theorem, whether an arbitrary modal formula has a first-order correspondent, there are formulas with first-order frame conditions that are not Sahlqvist [Chagrova 1991] (see the examples below). Hence Sahlqvist formulas define only a (decidable) subset of modal formulas with first-order correspondents.

== Definition ==
Sahlqvist formulas are built up from implications, where the consequent is positive and the antecedent is of a restricted form.

- A boxed atom is a propositional atom preceded by a number (possibly 0) of boxes, i.e. a formula of the form $\Box\cdots\Box p$ (often abbreviated as $\Box^i p$ for $0 \leq i < \omega$).
- A Sahlqvist antecedent is a formula constructed using ∧, ∨, and $\Diamond$ from boxed atoms, and negative formulas (including the constants ⊥, ⊤).
- A Sahlqvist implication is a formula A → B, where A is a Sahlqvist antecedent, and B is a positive formula.
- A Sahlqvist formula is constructed from Sahlqvist implications using ∧ and $\Box$ (unrestricted), and using ∨ on formulas with no common variables.

== Examples of Sahlqvist formulas ==
$p \rightarrow \Diamond p$
Its first-order corresponding formula is $\forall x \; Rxx$, and it defines all reflexive frames
$p \rightarrow \Box\Diamond p$
Its first-order corresponding formula is $\forall x \forall y [Rxy \rightarrow Ryx]$, and it defines all symmetric frames
$\Diamond \Diamond p \rightarrow \Diamond p$ or $\Box p \rightarrow \Box \Box p$
Its first-order corresponding formula is $\forall x \forall y \forall z [(Rxy \land Ryz) \rightarrow Rxz]$, and it defines all transitive frames
$\Diamond p \rightarrow \Diamond \Diamond p$ or $\Box \Box p \rightarrow \Box p$
Its first-order corresponding formula is $\forall x \forall y [Rxy \rightarrow \exists z (Rxz \land Rzy)]$, and it defines all dense frames
$\Box p \rightarrow \Diamond p$
Its first-order corresponding formula is $\forall x \exists y \; Rxy$, and it defines all right-unbounded frames (also called serial)
$\Diamond\Box p \rightarrow \Box\Diamond p$
Its first-order corresponding formula is $\forall x \forall x_1 \forall z_0 [Rxx_1 \land Rxz_0 \rightarrow \exists z_1 (Rx_1z_1 \land Rz_0z_1)]$, and it is the Church–Rosser property.

== Examples of non-Sahlqvist formulas ==
$\Box\Diamond p \rightarrow \Diamond \Box p$
This is the McKinsey formula; it does not have a first-order frame condition.
$\Box(\Box p \rightarrow p) \rightarrow \Box p$
The Löb axiom is not Sahlqvist; again, it does not have a first-order frame condition.
$(\Box\Diamond p \rightarrow \Diamond \Box p) \land (\Diamond\Diamond q \rightarrow \Diamond q)$
The conjunction of the McKinsey formula and the (4) axiom has a first-order frame condition (the conjunction of the transitivity property with the property $\forall x[\forall y(Rxy \rightarrow \exists z[Ryz]) \rightarrow \exists y(Rxy \wedge \forall z[Ryz \rightarrow z = y])]$) but is not equivalent to any Sahlqvist formula.

== Kracht's theorem ==
When a Sahlqvist formula is used as an axiom in a normal modal logic, the logic is guaranteed to be complete with respect to the basic elementary class of frames the axiom defines. This result comes from the Sahlqvist completeness theorem [Modal Logic, Blackburn et al., Theorem 4.42]. But there is also a converse theorem, namely a theorem that states which first-order conditions are the correspondents of Sahlqvist formulas. Kracht's theorem states that any Sahlqvist formula locally corresponds to a Kracht formula; and conversely, every Kracht formula is a local first-order correspondent of some Sahlqvist formula which can be effectively obtained from the Kracht formula [Modal Logic, Blackburn et al., Theorem 3.59].
