= Neighborhood semantics =

Neighborhood semantics, also known as Scott–Montague semantics, is a formal semantics for modal logics. It is a generalization, developed independently by Dana Scott and Richard Montague, of the more widely known relational semantics for modal logic. Whereas a relational frame $\langle W,R\rangle$ consists of a set W of worlds (or states) and an accessibility relation R intended to indicate which worlds are alternatives to (or, accessible from) others, a neighborhood frame $\langle W,N\rangle$ still has a set W of worlds, but has instead of an accessibility relation a neighborhood function

$$N : W \to 2^{2^W}$$

that assigns to each element of W a set of subsets of W. Intuitively, each family of subsets assigned to a world are the propositions necessary at that world, where 'proposition' is defined as a subset of W (i.e. the set of worlds at which the proposition is true). Specifically, if M is a model on the frame, then

$$M,w\models\square \varphi \Longleftrightarrow (\varphi)^M \in N(w),$$

where

$$(\varphi)^M = \{u\in W \mid M,u\models \varphi \}$$

is the truth set of $\varphi$.

Neighborhood semantics is used for the classical modal logics that are strictly weaker than the normal modal logic K.

== Correspondence between relational and neighborhood models ==
To every relational model M = (W, R, V) there corresponds an equivalent (in the sense of having pointwise-identical modal theories) neighborhood model M' = (W, N, V) defined by

$$N(w) = \{(\varphi)^M \mid M,w\models\Box \varphi\}.$$

But this is not the only possible choice for equivalence, N can also be defined only with reference to R (and W):

$N'(w) = \{X \subseteq W \mid \{u \in W\mid wRu\} \subseteq X\}.$

For any w, N'(w) contains N(w) but may be strictly bigger, since some elements of it may not be the truth set of any formula in M.

The fact that the converse fails gives a precise sense to the remark that neighborhood models are a generalization of relational ones. Another (perhaps more natural) generalization of relational structures are general frames.

== Relation to predicate transformers ==
Using that a subset $2^W$ is equivalent to its characteristic function $W \to 2$, a neighborhood function $N$ can also be understood as a predicate transformer:

$$(W \to 2^{2^W}) \cong (W \to 2^W \to 2) \cong (2^W \to W \to 2) \cong (2^W \to 2^W)$$
