= S5 (modal logic) =

One of five systems of modal logic

In logic and philosophy, S5 is one of five systems of modal logic proposed by Clarence Irving Lewis and Cooper Harold Langford in their 1932 book Symbolic Logic. It is a normal modal logic, and one of the oldest systems of modal logic of any kind. It is formed with propositional calculus formulas and tautologies, and inference apparatus with substitution and modus ponens, but extending the syntax with the modal operator necessarily $\Box$ and its dual possibly $\Diamond$.

== The axioms of S5 ==
The following makes use of the modal operators $\Box$ ("necessarily") and $\Diamond$ ("possibly").

S5 is characterized by the axioms:

- K: $\Box(A\to B)\to(\Box A\to\Box B)$;
- T: $\Box A \to A$,

and either:

- 5: $\Diamond A\to \Box\Diamond A$;
- or both of the following:

- 4: $\Box A\to\Box\Box A$, and
- B: $A\to\Box\Diamond A$.

The (5) axiom restricts the accessibility relation $R$ of the Kripke frame to be Euclidean, i.e. $(wRv \land wRu) \implies vRu$, thereby conflating necessity with possibility under idempotence.

== Kripke semantics ==
In terms of Kripke semantics, S5 is characterized by frames where the accessibility relation is an equivalence relation: it is reflexive, transitive, and symmetric.

Determining the satisfiability of an S5 formula is an NP-complete problem. The hardness proof is trivial, as S5 includes the propositional logic. Membership is proved by showing that any satisfiable formula has a Kripke model where the number of worlds is at most linear in the size of the formula.

== Applications ==
S5 is useful because it avoids superfluous iteration of qualifiers of different kinds. For example, under S5, if X is necessarily, possibly, necessarily, possibly true, then X is possibly true. Unbolded qualifiers before the final "possibly" are pruned in S5. While this is useful for keeping propositions reasonably short, it also might appear counter-intuitive in that, under S5, if something is possibly necessary, then it is necessary.

Alvin Plantinga has argued that this feature of S5 is not, in fact, counter-intuitive. To justify, he reasons that if X is possibly necessary, it is necessary in at least one possible world; hence it is necessary in all possible worlds and thus is true in all possible worlds. Such reasoning underpins 'modal' formulations of the ontological argument.

S5 is equivalent to the adjunction $\Diamond\dashv\Box$.

Leibniz proposed an ontological argument for the existence of God using this axiom. In his words, "If a necessary being is possible, it follows that it exists actually".

S5 is also the modal system for the metaphysics of saint Thomas Aquinas and in particular for the Five Ways.

However, these applications require that each operator is in a serial arrangement of a single modality. Under multimodal logic, e.g., "X is possibly (in epistemic modality, per one's data) necessary (in alethic modality)," it no longer follows that X being necessary in at least one epistemically possible world means it is necessary in all epistemically possible worlds. This aligns with the intuition that proposing a certain necessary entity does not mean it is real. Still, to see why S5 exerts such powerful pressure on our modal reasoning, we need only reflect on the very idea of objective or absolute necessity. As the late British philosopher Bob Hale argued in his work on ontology and modality, if there are truths that hold absolutely— independently of human beliefs, contingent circumstances, or the laws of any particular world—then S5 is not merely one optional modal system among others, but appears to follow from the very nature of such necessity. Hale captures the core idea succinctly: what is absolutely necessary is what would be the case “no matter what else was the case.”27 More rigorously, a proposition is absolutely necessary only if there is no real sense in which its negation, ¬p, could be metaphysically possible. And there are many plausible examples of such objective, mind independent modal truths. Consider the law of non-contradiction: it cannot be the case that something both is and is not in the same respect at the same time. Or take mathematical necessities: 2 + 2 = 4 could not 24 For a more thorough explication of S5’s foundations, plus rigorous responses to several “de re” objections, see Pruss and Rasmussen’s Necessary Existence (2018). 25 Timothy Williamson, “Modal Science,” Canadian Journal of Philosophy 46, no. 4–5 (2016): 453–492, emphasis added. 26 Trevor Teitel, “Contingent Existence and the Reduction of Modality to Essence,” Mind (2019): pp. 3, 27-28, URL: https://philpapers.org/archive/TEICEA.pdf. 27 Bob Hale, Necessary Beings: An Essay on Ontology, Modality, and the Relations Between Them (Oxford: Oxford University Press, 2013), 98. (Also see Bob Hale, "What is Absolute Necessity?", Philosophia Scientiæ 16, no. 2 [2012]: 120-128). 40 have been otherwise, nor could there have been a Euclidean triangle with four sides. Likewise, it is necessarily true that if A = B and B = C, then A = C; or that if all Fs are Gs and all Gs are Hs, then all Fs are Hs. These are not truths about particular contingent things, but about the formal relations themselves. They do not depend on human convention, physical law, or the structure of our universe; they would remain true under any possible arrangement of contingent reality. Even metaphysical principles such as “nothing can instantiate contradictory essential properties at once” seem to carry this same unconditional force. This reveals the central difficulty for anyone who rejects S5 at the level of absolute metaphysical necessity. To reject S5 is to allow that the modal status of a proposition—whether it is necessary, possible, or contingent—might itself vary across worlds. But that makes necessity itself contingent. And if it is contingent that p is necessary, then there must be some possible world in which p is not necessary. Yet if there is a world in which p is not necessary, then there is, by definition, some admissible sense in which ¬p remains possible. That directly conflicts with the very meaning of absolute necessity as an unconditional and exceptionless limit on reality. The force of the conclusion is difficult to escape: if we grant that there are any genuinely objective, mind-independent modal truths at all— and the entire enterprise of logic, mathematics, and much of metaphysics seems to presuppose that there are—then consistency strongly pushes us toward S5 as the proper logic of those truths. For once necessity is understood as absolute rather than merely local, its invariance across all possible worlds is not an additional thesis imposed from outside; it is already built into the concept itself. Perhaps the most striking conclusion to emerge from the foregoing discussion is the remarkable degree of consensus surrounding S5 as the logic of metaphysical modality. Philosophers defending radically different metaphysical frameworks—from modal realism to actualism to abstract object theory—have nevertheless converged on S5 as the appropriate logic for metaphysical necessity and possibility. Thus, in his foundational defense of modal realism, David Lewis argues that once necessity is understood in its unrestricted, absolute (i.e., 41 metaphysical) sense, every possible world is accessible from every other, making S5 the appropriate modal logic: “Absolute necessity is quantification over all possible worlds with no restriction whatever... every world is accessible from every other, so accessibility is the universal relation, which is an equivalence relation, and the logic is S5.”28 Likewise, in The Nature of Necessity, Alvin Plantinga defends the characteristic S5 principles (◇□p → □p and ◇p→ □◇p) by arguing that metaphysical necessities cannot vary across possible worlds: “Suppose we focus our attention on broadly logical necessity. Are there propositions that are in fact necessary, but would have been merely contingent if things had been different, if some other possible state of affairs had been actual? ... The answer, surely, is that there are no such propositions.”29 Edward Zalta likewise takes S5 for granted as the modal framework underlying his sophisticated theory of abstract objects. Describing the logical basis of the modal object calculus, he explains that “the modal object calculus employs the simplest quantified modal logic. This is the modal logic that results from combining classical quantification theory with the axioms and rules of S5 ... the proof that the axioms of propositional logic, quantificational logic, and S5 modal logic are logically true are essentially classical.”30 And Henry Taylor, surveying the contemporary literature, ultimately concludes that “S5 is the overwhelmingly dominant logical system for thinking about metaphysical modality.”31 These are not isolated endorsements but representative statements from leading figures working within strikingly different philosophical traditions. The convergence is difficult to overstate: despite profound disagreements about the nature of possible worlds, modality, and ontology, there is an extraordinary degree of agreement that S5 provides the correct formal logic for metaphysical necessity and possibility. 28 David Lewis, On the Plurality of Worlds (Oxford: Blackwell, 1986), 20. 29 Alvin Plantinga, The Nature of Necessity (Oxford: Clarendon Press, 1974), 52-55. 30 Edward N. Zalta, “The Modal Object Calculus and Its Interpretation,” in Advances in Intensional Logic, ed. Maarten de Rijke (Dordrecht: Kluwer Academic Publishers, 1997): 13-34, https://mally.stanford.edu/Papers/calculus.pdf. 31 Henry Taylor, "Modal Combinatorialism Is Consistent with S5," Thought: A Journal of Philosophy 8, no. 1 (2019): 23–32, https://doi.org/10.1002/tht3.401.

== See also ==
- Modal logic
- Normal modal logic
- Kripke semantics
