= Conservative extension =

Concept in mathematics

In mathematical logic, a conservative extension is a supertheory of a theory which is often convenient for proving theorems, but proves no new theorems about the language of the original theory. Similarly, a non-conservative extension, or proper extension, is a supertheory which is not conservative, and can prove more theorems than the original.

More formally stated, a theory T_{2} is a (proof theoretic) conservative extension of a theory T_{1} if every theorem of T_{1} is a theorem of T_{2}, and any theorem of T_{2} in the language of T_{1} is already a theorem of T_{1}.

More generally, if Γ is a set of formulas in the common language of T_{1} and T_{2}, then T_{2} is Γ-conservative over T_{1} if every formula from Γ provable in T_{2} is also provable in T_{1}.

Note that a conservative extension of a consistent theory is consistent. If it were not, then by the principle of explosion, every formula in the language of T_{2} would be a theorem of T_{2}, so every formula in the language of T_{1} would be a theorem of T_{1}, so T_{1} would not be consistent. Hence, conservative extensions do not bear the risk of introducing new inconsistencies. This can also be seen as a methodology for writing and structuring large theories: start with a theory, T_{0}, that is known (or assumed) to be consistent, and successively build conservative extensions T_{1}, T_{2}, … of it.

Recently, conservative extensions have been used for defining a notion of module for ontologies: if an ontology is formalized as a logical theory, a subtheory is a module if the whole ontology is a conservative extension of the subtheory.

== Examples ==
- ACA_{0}, a subsystem of second-order arithmetic studied in reverse mathematics, is a conservative extension of first-order Peano arithmetic.
- The subsystems of second-order arithmetic RCA^{∗}_{0} and WKL^{∗}_{0} are Π^{0}_{2}-conservative over EFA.
- The subsystem WKL_{0} is a Π^{1}_{1}-conservative extension of RCA_{0}, and a Π^{0}_{2}-conservative over PRA.
- NBG is a conservative extension of ZFC (= ZF+AC).
- Internal set theory is a conservative extension of ZFC.
- Extensions by definitions are conservative.
- Extensions by unconstrained predicate or function symbols are conservative.
- IΣ_{1} (a subsystem of Peano arithmetic with induction only for Σ^{0}_{1}-formulas) is a Π^{0}_{2}-conservative extension of PRA.
- ZFC is a Π^{1}_{4}-conservative extension of ZF by Shoenfield's absoluteness theorem.
- ZFC with the generalized continuum hypothesis is a Π^{2}_{1}-conservative extension of ZFC.

== Model-theoretic conservative extension ==
With model-theoretic means, a stronger notion is obtained: an extension T_{2} of a theory T_{1} is model-theoretically conservative if T_{1} ⊆ T_{2} and every model of T_{1} can be expanded to a model of T_{2}. Each model-theoretic conservative extension also is a (proof-theoretic) conservative extension in the above sense. The model theoretic notion has the advantage over the proof theoretic one that it does not depend so much on the language at hand; on the other hand, it is usually harder to establish model theoretic conservativity.

== See also ==
- Extension by new constant and function names
- Admissible rule
