= Conceptual necessity =

Philosophical concept

Conceptual necessity is a property of the certainty with which a state of affairs, as presented by a certain description, occurs: it occurs by conceptual necessity if and only if it occurs just by virtue of the meaning of the description. If someone is a bachelor, for instance, then he is bound to be unmarried by conceptual necessity, because the meaning of the word "bachelor" determines that he is.

Alternatively, there is metaphysical necessity, which is a certainty determined, not by the meaning of a description, but instead by facts in the world described.

Historically, Baruch Spinoza was a subscriber to this belief.

== See also ==
- Modal logic
- Analytic-synthetic distinction
