= Formalization =

Formalization or formalisation may refer to

- Formalization of mathematics
- Logic translation of a natural language text to formal logic
- Drafting formal specifications
- A process enhancing bureaucracy in sociology
