= Regular modal logic =

In modal logic, a regular modal logic is a modal logic containing (as axiom or theorem) the duality of the modal operators:

$\Diamond A \leftrightarrow \lnot\Box\lnot A$

and closed under the rule

$\frac{(A\land B)\to C}{(\Box A\land\Box B)\to\Box C}.$

Every normal modal logic is regular, and every regular modal logic is classical.
