= Extension by definition =

In logic, defining a new symbol

In mathematical logic, more specifically in the proof theory of first-order theories, an extension by definition formalizes the introduction of a new symbol by means of a definition. For example, it is common in naive set theory to introduce a symbol $\emptyset$ for the set that has no member. In the formal setting of first-order theories, this can be done by adding to the theory a new constant $\emptyset$ and the new axiom $\forall x(x\notin\emptyset)$, meaning "for all x, x is not a member of $\emptyset$". It can then be proved that doing so adds essentially nothing to the old theory, as should be expected from a definition. More precisely, the new theory is a conservative extension of the old one.

== Definition of relation symbols ==
Let $T$ be a first-order theory and $\phi(x_1,\dots,x_n)$ a formula of $T$ such that $x_1$, ..., $x_n$ are distinct and include the variables free in $\phi(x_1,\dots,x_n)$. Form a new first-order theory $T'$ from $T$ by adding a new $n$-ary relation symbol $R$, the logical axioms featuring the symbol $R$ and the new axiom

$$\forall x_1\dots\forall x_n(R(x_1,\dots,x_n)\leftrightarrow\phi(x_1,\dots,x_n))$$,

called the defining axiom of $R$.

If $\psi$ is a formula of $T'$, let $\psi^\ast$ be the formula of $T$ obtained from $\psi$ by replacing any occurrence of $R(t_1,\dots,t_n)$ by $\phi(t_1,\dots,t_n)$ (changing the bound variables in $\phi$ if necessary so that the variables occurring in the $t_i$ are not bound in $\phi(t_1,\dots,t_n)$). Then the following hold:

1. $\psi\leftrightarrow\psi^\ast$ is provable in $T'$, and
2. $T'$ is a conservative extension of $T$.

The fact that $T'$ is a conservative extension of $T$ shows that the defining axiom of $R$ cannot be used to prove new theorems. The formula $\psi^\ast$ is called a translation of $\psi$ into $T$. Semantically, the formula $\psi^\ast$ has the same meaning as $\psi$, but the defined symbol $R$ has been eliminated.

== Definition of function symbols ==
Let $T$ be a first-order theory (with equality) and $\phi(y,x_1,\dots,x_n)$ a formula of $T$ such that $y$, $x_1$, ..., $x_n$ are distinct and include the variables free in $\phi(y,x_1,\dots,x_n)$. Assume that we can prove

$$\forall x_1\dots\forall x_n\exists !y\phi(y,x_1,\dots,x_n)$$

in $T$, i.e. for all $x_1$, ..., $x_n$, there exists a unique y such that $\phi(y,x_1,\dots,x_n)$. Form a new first-order theory $T'$ from $T$ by adding a new $n$-ary function symbol $f$, the logical axioms featuring the symbol $f$ and the new axiom

$$\forall x_1\dots\forall x_n\phi(f(x_1,\dots,x_n),x_1,\dots,x_n)$$,

called the defining axiom of $f$.

Let $\psi$ be any atomic formula of $T'$. We define formula $\psi^\ast$ of $T$ recursively as follows. If the new symbol $f$ does not occur in $\psi$, let $\psi^\ast$ be $\psi$. Otherwise, choose an occurrence of $f(t_1,\dots,t_n)$ in $\psi$ such that $f$ does not occur in the terms $t_i$, and let $\chi$ be obtained from $\psi$ by replacing that occurrence by a new variable $z$. Then since $f$ occurs in $\chi$ one less time than in $\psi$, the formula $\chi^\ast$ has already been defined, and we let $\psi^\ast$ be

$$\forall z(\phi(z,t_1,\dots,t_n)\rightarrow\chi^\ast)$$

(changing the bound variables in $\phi$ if necessary so that the variables occurring in the $t_i$ are not bound in $\phi(z,t_1,\dots,t_n)$). For a general formula $\psi$, the formula $\psi^\ast$ is formed by replacing every occurrence of an atomic subformula $\chi$ by $\chi^\ast$. Then the following hold:

1. $\psi\leftrightarrow\psi^\ast$ is provable in $T'$, and
2. $T'$ is a conservative extension of $T$.

The formula $\psi^\ast$ is called a translation of $\psi$ into $T$. As in the case of relation symbols, the formula $\psi^\ast$ has the same meaning as $\psi$, but the new symbol $f$ has been eliminated.

The construction of this paragraph also works for constants, which can be viewed as 0-ary function symbols.

== Extensions by definitions ==
A first-order theory $T'$ obtained from $T$ by successive introductions of relation symbols and function symbols as above is called an extension by definitions of $T$. Then $T'$ is a conservative extension of $T$, and for any formula $\psi$ of $T'$ we can form a formula $\psi^\ast$ of $T$, called a translation of $\psi$ into $T$, such that $\psi\leftrightarrow\psi^\ast$ is provable in $T'$. Such a formula is not unique, but any two of them can be proved to be equivalent in T.

In practice, an extension by definitions $T'$ of T is not distinguished from the original theory T. In fact, the formulas of $T'$ can be thought of as abbreviating their translations into T. The manipulation of these abbreviations as actual formulas is then justified by the fact that extensions by definitions are conservative.

== Examples ==
- Traditionally, the first-order set theory ZF has $=$ (equality) and $\in$ (membership) as its only primitive relation symbols, and no function symbols. In everyday mathematics, however, many other symbols are used such as the binary relation symbol $\subseteq$, the constant $\emptyset$, the unary function symbol P (the power set operation), etc. All of these symbols belong in fact to extensions by definitions of ZF.
- Let $T$ be a first-order theory for groups in which the only primitive symbol is the binary product ×. In T, we can prove that there exists a unique element y such that x × y = y × x = x for every x. Therefore, we can add to T a new constant e and the axiom

$$\forall x(x \times e = x \land e \times x = x)$$,

and what we obtain is an extension by definitions $T'$ of $T$. Then in $T'$ we can prove that for every x, there exists a unique y such that x × y = y × x = e. Consequently, the first-order theory $T''$ obtained from $T'$ by adding a unary function symbol $f$ and the axiom

$$\forall x(x \times f(x)=e \land f(x) \times x=e)$$

is an extension by definitions of $T$. Usually, $f(x)$ is denoted $x^{-1}$.

== See also ==
- Conservative extension
- Definite description
- Epsilon calculus
- Extension by new constant and function names

== Bibliography ==
- S. C. Kleene (1952), Introduction to Metamathematics, D. Van Nostrand
- E. Mendelson (1997). Introduction to Mathematical Logic (4th ed.), Chapman & Hall.
- J. R. Shoenfield (1967). Mathematical Logic, Addison-Wesley Publishing Company (reprinted in 2001 by AK Peters)
