= J. C. C. McKinsey =

American mathematician (1908–1953)

J.C.C. McKinsey
- Born: 30 April 1908; Clinton County, Indiana, U.S.
- Died: October 26, 1953 (aged 45); Palo Alto, California, U.S.
- Other name: Chen McKinsey
- Education: New York University (BS, MS), University of California, Berkeley (PhD)
- Known for: Game theory
- Awards: Guggenheim Fellowship
- Scientific career
- Fields: Mathematical logic Game theory
- Workplaces: New York University, Montana State College, University of Nevada, University of Oklahoma, RAND Corporation, Stanford University
- Thesis: On Boolean functions of many variables
- Doctoral advisor: Benjamin Abram Bernstein
- Doctoral students: Jean Rubin
- Other notable students: Ruth Barcan Marcus

John Charles Chenoweth McKinsey (30 April 1908 – 26 October 1953) was an American mathematician known for his work on game theory and mathematical logic, particularly, modal logic.

== Biography ==
McKinsey received B.S. and M.S. degrees from New York University and a Ph.D. degree in 1936 from the University of California, Berkeley. He was a Blumenthal Research Fellow at New York University from 1936 to 1937 and a Guggenheim Fellow from 1942 to 1943. He also taught at Montana State College, and in Nevada, then Oklahoma, and in 1947 he went "to a research group at Douglas Aircraft Corporation" that later became the RAND Corporation.

McKinsey worked at RAND until he was fired in 1951. The FBI considered him a security risk because he was a homosexual, in spite of the fact that he was an open homosexual who had been in a committed relationship for years. He complained to his superior "How can anyone threaten me with disclosure when everybody already knows?"

From 1951 he taught at Stanford University, where he was later appointed a Full Professor in the Department of Philosophy, where he worked with Patrick Suppes on the axiomatic foundations of classical mechanics. He committed suicide at his home in Palo Alto in 1953.

== Selected works ==
=== Book ===
- McKinsey, J.C.C. (2003). Introduction to the Theory of Games. New York: Dover Publications. ISBN 978-0-486-42811-6. (originally publ. McGraw-Hill, 1952)

=== Papers ===
- McKinsey, J. C. C. (1934). "A reduction in number of the postulates for C. S. Lewis' system of strict implication". Bull. Amer. Math. Soc. 40 (6): 425–427. doi:10.1090/s0002-9904-1934-05881-6. MR 1562873. S2CID 120247475.
- McKinsey, J. C. C. (1935). "On the independence of undefined ideas". Bull. Amer. Math. Soc. 41 (4): 291–297. doi:10.1090/s0002-9904-1935-06074-4. MR 1563075.
- McKinsey, J. C. C. (1936). "Reducible Boolean functions". Bull. Amer. Math. Soc. 42 (4): 263–267. doi:10.1090/s0002-9904-1936-06285-3. MR 1563282.
- McKinsey, J. C. C. (1936). "On Boolean functions of many variables". Trans. Amer. Math. Soc. 40 (3): 343–362. doi:10.1090/s0002-9947-1936-1501878-6. MR 1501878.
- McKinsey, J. C. C. (1941). "A solution of the decision problem for the Lewis systems S2 and S4, with an application to topology." The Journal of Symbolic Logic. 6 (4), 117–124. doi:10.2307/2267105
- "A New Definition of Truth". Synthese. 7: 428–433. 1948.
- McKinsey, J. C. C. (1952). "Some notions and problems of game theory". Bull. Amer. Math. Soc. 58 (6): 591–611. doi:10.1090/s0002-9904-1952-09648-8. MR 0052748.
- McKinsey, J.; Sugar, A.; Suppes, Patrick (1953). "Axiomatic foundations of classical particle mechanics". Journal of Rational Mechanics and Analysis. 2 (2): 253–72. doi:10.1512/iumj.1953.2.52012.
- "Philosophy and the axiomatic foundations of physics". Proceedings of the 11th International Congress of Philosophy. 6: 49–53. 1953.

==== With Alfred Tarski ====
- McKinsey, J. C. C., Tarski, Alfred (1944). "The algebra of topology." Annals of mathematics, 141–191. https://doi.org/10.2307/1969080.
- McKinsey, J. C., Tarski, Alfred (1946). "On closed elements in closure algebras." Annals of mathematics, 122–162. https://doi.org/10.2307/1969038.
- McKinsey, J. C. C.; Tarski, Alfred (1948). "Some theorem about the sentential calculi of Lewis and Heyting". Journal of Symbolic Logic. 13 (1): 1–15. doi:10.2307/2268135. JSTOR 2268135. S2CID 38559151.
