= Extension by new constant and function names =

Mathematical principle

In mathematical logic, a theory can be extended with new constants or function names under certain conditions with assurance that the extension will introduce no contradiction. Extension by definitions is perhaps the best-known approach, but it requires unique existence of an object with the desired property. Addition of new names can also be done safely without uniqueness.

== Example ==
Suppose that a closed formula

$$\exists x_1\ldots\exists x_m\,\varphi(x_1,\ldots,x_m)$$

is a theorem of a first-order theory $T$. Let $T_1$ be a theory obtained from $T$ by extending its language with new constants

$$a_1,\ldots,a_m$$

and adding a new axiom

$$\varphi(a_1,\ldots,a_m)$$.

== Conservative extension ==
Then $T_1$ is a conservative extension of $T$, which means that the theory $T_1$ has the same set of theorems in the original language (i.e., without constants $a_i$) as the theory $T$.

Such a theory can also be conservatively extended by introducing a new functional symbol:

Suppose that a closed formula $\forall \vec{x}\,\exists y\,\!\,\varphi(y,\vec{x})$ is a theorem of a first-order theory $T$, where we denote $\vec{x}:=(x_1,\ldots,x_n)$. Let $T_1$ be a theory obtained from $T$ by extending its language with a new functional symbol $f$ (of arity $n$) and adding a new axiom $\forall \vec{x}\,\varphi(f(\vec{x}),\vec{x})$. Then $T_1$ is a conservative extension of $T$, i.e. the theories $T$ and $T_1$ prove the same theorems not involving the functional symbol $f$).

Shoenfield states the theorem in the form for a new function name, and constants are the same as functions of zero arguments. In formal systems that admit ordered tuples, extension by multiple constants as shown here can be accomplished by addition of a new constant tuple and the new constant names having the values of elements of the tuple.

== See also ==
- Conservative extension
- Extension by definition
