= Modal algebra =

Boolean algebra with unary operators expressing necessity and possibility modalities

In algebra and logic, a modal algebra is a structure $\langle A,\land,\lor,-,0,1,\Box\rangle$ such that

- $\langle A,\land,\lor,-,0,1\rangle$ is a Boolean algebra,
- $\Box$ is a unary operation on A satisfying $\Box1=1$ and $\Box(x\land y)=\Box x\land\Box y$ for all x, y in A.

Modal algebras provide models of propositional modal logics in the same way as Boolean algebras are models of classical logic. In particular, the variety of all modal algebras is the equivalent algebraic semantics of the modal logic K in the sense of abstract algebraic logic, and the lattice of its subvarieties is dually isomorphic to the lattice of normal modal logics.

Stone's representation theorem can be generalized to the Jónsson–Tarski duality, which ensures that each modal algebra can be represented as the algebra of admissible sets in a modal general frame.

A Magari algebra (or diagonalizable algebra) is a modal algebra satisfying $\Box (-\Box x \lor x) = \Box x$. Magari algebras correspond to provability logic and are named after Roberto Magari.

An expansion on the concept of modal algebra is QSpire Algebra. Concepts include "Gödel Gap" (a true sentence that is unprovable in a theory T but is certifiable from outside of T) , allowing other operators in addition to the $\Box$ operator and examining the relationship between modal logic and mathematical optimization.

== See also ==
- Interior algebra
- Heyting algebra
