= Classical modal logic =

In modal logic, a classical modal logic L is any modal logic containing (as axiom or theorem scheme) the duality of the modal operators

$$\Diamond A \leftrightarrow \lnot\Box\lnot A$$

that is also closed under the (primitive or admissible) rule

$$\frac{ A \leftrightarrow B }{\Box A\leftrightarrow \Box B}.$$

Alternatively, one can give a dual definition of the classicality of L by which it is if and only if it contains (as axiom or theorem scheme)

$$\Box A \leftrightarrow \lnot\Diamond\lnot A$$

and is closed under the (primitive or admissible) rule

$$\frac{ A \leftrightarrow B }{\Diamond A\leftrightarrow \Diamond B}.$$

The weakest classical system is sometimes referred to as E and is non-normal. Both algebraic and neighborhood semantics characterize familiar classical modal systems that are weaker than the weakest normal modal logic K.

Every regular modal logic is classical, and every normal modal logic is regular and hence classical.
