= Normal modal logic =

Type of modal logic

In logic, a normal modal logic is a set L of modal formulas such that L contains:

- All propositional tautologies;
- All instances of the Kripke schema: $\Box(A\to B)\to(\Box A\to\Box B)$

and it is closed under:

- Detachment rule (modus ponens): $A\to B, A \in L$ implies $B \in L$;
- Necessitation rule: $A \in L$ implies $\Box A \in L$.

The smallest logic satisfying the above conditions is called K. Most modal logics commonly used nowadays (in terms of having philosophical motivations), e.g. C. I. Lewis's S4 and S5, are normal (and hence are extensions of K). However a number of deontic and epistemic logics, for example, are non-normal, often because they give up the Kripke schema.

Every normal modal logic is regular and hence classical.

== Common normal modal logics ==
The following table lists several common normal modal systems. The notation refers to the table at Kripke semantics § Common modal axiom schemata. Frame conditions for some of the systems were simplified: the logics are sound and complete with respect to the frame classes given in the table, but they may correspond to a larger class of frames.

Name	Axioms	Frame condition
K	—	all frames
T	T	reflexive
K4	4	transitive
S4	T, 4	preorder
S5	T, 5 or D, B, 4	equivalence relation
S4.3	T, 4, H	total preorder
S4.1	T, 4, M	preorder and $\forall w\,\exists u\,(w\,R\,u\land\forall v\,(u\,R\,v\Rightarrow u=v))$
S4.2	T, 4, G	directed preorder
GL, K4W	GL or 4, GL	finite strict partial order
Grz, S4Grz	Grz or T, 4, Grz	finite partial order
D	D	serial
D45	D, 4, 5	transitive, serial, and Euclidean
