= Leon Henkin =

American mathematician

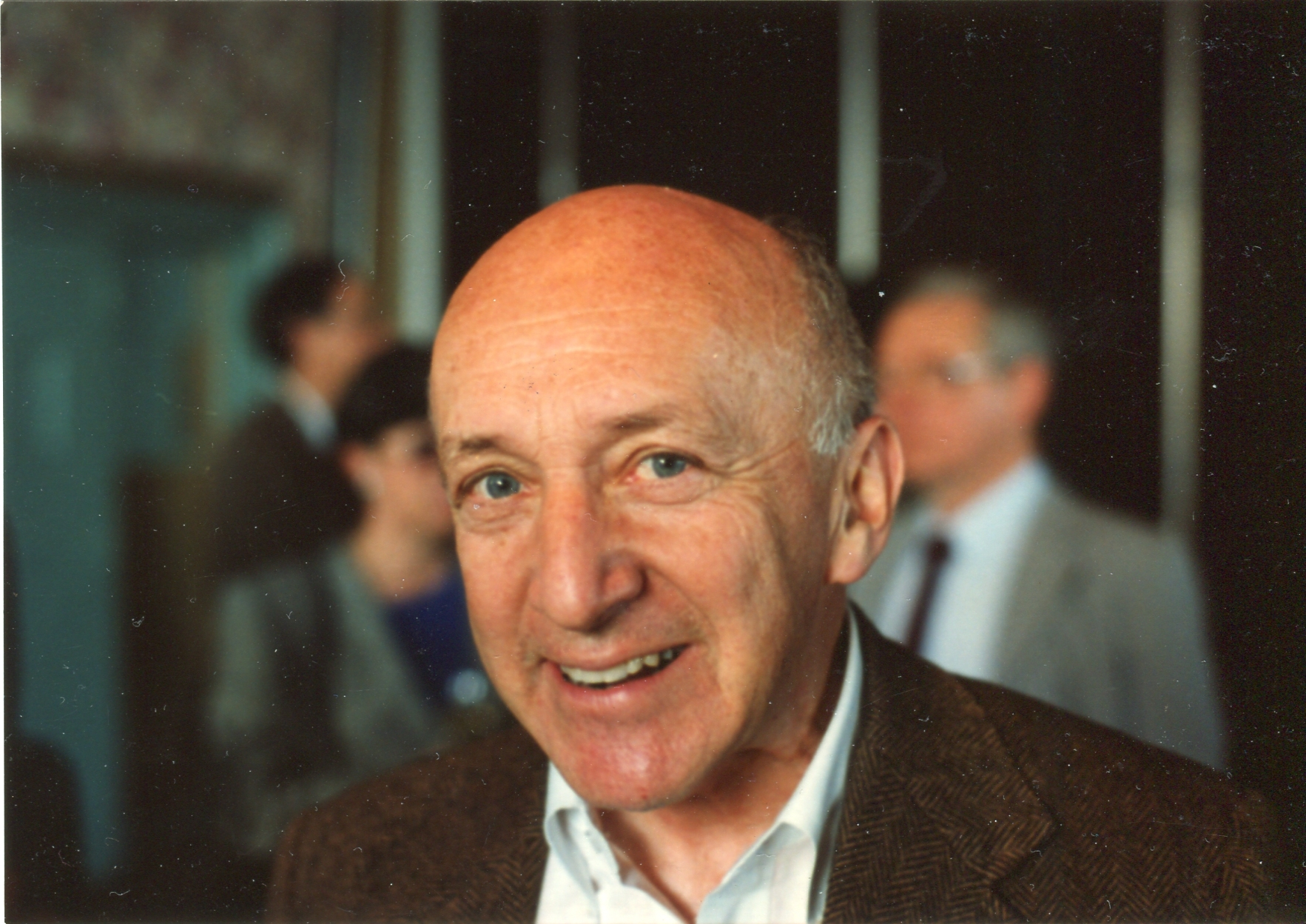
- Henkin in 1990
- Born: April 19, 1921; Brooklyn, New York City, U.S.
- Died: November 1, 2006 (aged 85)
- Education: Columbia University (BA) Princeton University (PhD)
- Known for: Model existence theorem Cylindrical algebra
- Scientific career
- Fields: Mathematical Logic
- Workplaces: University of California, Berkeley
- Thesis: The Completeness of Formal Systems
- Doctoral advisor: Alonzo Church
- Doctoral students: Carol Karp; Philip Treisman; David L. Ferguson; Nitsa Movshovitz-Hadar

Leon Albert Henkin (April 19, 1921, Brooklyn, New York City – November 1, 2006, Oakland, California) was an American logician, whose works played a strong role in the development of logic, particularly in the theory of types. He was an active scholar at the University of California, Berkeley, where he made great contributions as a researcher and teacher, as well as in administrative positions. At this university he directed, together with Alfred Tarski, the Group in Logic and the Methodology of Science, from which many important logicians and philosophers emerged. He had a strong sense of social commitment and was a passionate defender of his pacifist and progressive ideas. He took part in many social projects aimed at teaching mathematics, as well as projects aimed at supporting women's and minority groups to pursue careers in mathematics and related fields. A lover of dance and literature, he appreciated life in all its facets: art, culture, science and, above all, the warmth of human relations. He is remembered by his students for his great kindness, as well as for his academic and teaching excellence.

Henkin is mainly known for his completeness proofs of diverse formal systems, such as type theory and first-order logic (the completeness of the latter, in its weak version, had been proven by Kurt Gödel in 1929). To prove the completeness of type theory, Henkin introduces new semantics, not equivalent to standard semantics, based on structures called general models (also known as Henkin models). The change of semantics that he proposed permits to provide a complete deductive calculus for type theory and for second-order logic, amongst other logics. Henkin methods have aided in proving various model theory results, both in classical and non-classical logics. Besides logic, the other branch on which his investigations were centered was algebra; he specialized in cylindric algebras, in which he worked together with Tarski and Donald Monk. As for the philosophy of mathematics, although the works in which he explicitly approaches it are scarce, he can be considered to have a nominalist position.

== Life ==
=== Childhood and first youth ===
Leon Albert Henkin was born on April 19, 1921, in Brooklyn, New York City, to a Jewish family that had emigrated from Russia a generation earlier. The first of the family to emigrate was Abraham Henkin, the eldest of the brothers of Leon's father. According to Leon, his father had been extremely proud of him since he was just a boy. His high expectations were evident in the name he gave him: he chose to name his son Albert after a series of articles on Einstein's theory of relativity that the New York Times published shortly before Henkin's birth. His family was sympathetic to pacifist and progressive ideas, and although he was not religious, he had deeply rooted Jewish traditions. Leon grew up surrounded by tight family ties; he was very close to his cousins, with whom he lived during his childhood in Brooklyn.

Henkin studied primarily in New York City public schools; he attended Lincoln High School, where he graduated at age 16 to enter Columbia University. Both in college and high school he was a member of the chess teams; he always preferred games that involved rational thinking to games of chance. In the years of his high school education, Henkin considered becoming a math teacher and also came to desire to become a writer (as he later expressed in a personal letter). Although he dedicated himself to university academic life, he never abandoned his interest in teaching elementary mathematics, to which he later actively contributed.

=== The first university studies ===
In 1937 Leon entered Columbia University as a mathematics student. It was during his time at this institution that he developed an interest in logic, which would determine the course of his academic career. His first contact with logic was through B. Russell's book Mysticism and Mathematics, which drew his interest during a visit to the library. This interest was increased and cultivated by some courses. Although the mathematics department of the University did not offer courses in Logic (these were offered by the Philosophy department), Leon was one of the few mathematics students interested in that discipline and he decided to attend them. In the fall of 1938, in his second year as a Columbia University student, he participated in a first course in Logic taught by Ernest Nagel, who had contributed to the creation of the Association of Symbolic Logic two years earlier. This course brought him closer to Russell's book Principles of Mathematics, where he first encountered the axiom of choice; Russell's presentation made a strong impression on him and led him to explore the Principia Mathematica that Russell wrote with Whitehead a few years later. He was struck by the general ideas of Type Theory and by the mysterious axiom of reducibility. Both the axiom of choice and Type Theory later played an important role in his doctoral dissertation.

The following year, in the fall semester of 1939, Henkin took a second course of Logic with Nagel, in which formal systems of propositional logic and first-order logic were addressed. These constituted his first experience with the mathematical treatment of deductive systems. The course did not go into metalogical results that established a relationship between semantics and syntactics, and the issue of completeness was not addressed at all. However, Nagel proposed to Henkin as an independent project the reading of the proof of the completeness of propositional logic given by Quine, which had appeared a few months before in the Journal of Symbolic Logic. This reading was highly significant for Henkin, not so much because of the content itself, but because with it he discovered that he could understand the research on logic and mathematics that was taking place at the time. According to Henkin, although he managed to follow Quine's demonstration, he did not manage to capture the idea of the proof: "I simply noted that the aim of the paper was to show that every tautology had a formal proof in the system of axioms presented, and I expended my utmost effort to check Quine's reasoning that this was so, without ever reflecting on why author and reader were making this effort. This strictly limited objective also kept me from wondering how the author thought of putting the steps of the proof together; the result was that I failed to get 'the idea of the proof', the essential ingredient needed for discovery."

Just before Henkin began his second year at Columbia, World War II broke out. This had several repercussions on his life. One of them had a positive effect on his education. Days before the war broke out, the Polish mathematician and logician Alfred Tarski had come to Harvard, at Quine's invitation, to give a series of lectures on logic. With the invasion of Poland by Germany, Tarski found it impossible to return to Poland and he had to remain in the United States. Tarski visited several cities giving lectures on logic. One of these lectures was at Columbia, and Henkin, like the rest of the logic students, attended it with great enthusiasm. In it Tarski spoke of Gödel's work on undecidable propositions in Type Theory and on the existence of decision algorithms for formal systems, a subject that Henkin found extremely stimulating.

In his last year at Columbia, in 1941, Professor F. J. Murray, knowing that Henkin was a mathematics student interested in Logic, suggested that they review together the monograph by Gödel recently published at Princeton on the consistency of the axiom of choice with the generalized continuum hypothesis. Although the meetings they had to discuss it were scarce and Leon ended up revising this monograph practically alone, the experience was considered by him as the most enriching one in his formation at Columbia. According to Henkin, then began to take form some of the ideas that became the starting-point of his doctoral dissertation.

In 1940, Henkin decided to apply for admission to a doctoral program, without having fully defined what path to follow in his research. He was accepted to three universities, from which he chose Princeton, since the renowned logician Alonzo Church was there, although at the time Henkin was unaware of his work.

=== Postgraduate studies ===
Henkin began his graduate studies at Princeton in 1941, studying under the direction of Church. The Ph.D. program he attended consisted of two years of mathematics courses, after which he was to take a "qualifying" oral examination to show he was well educated in at least three branches of mathematics; with this, he would receive an M.A. degree. He would then have another two years to write a doctoral dissertation containing original research, after which he would get the degree of Ph.D.

During the first two years, he took courses in logic (taught by Church), analysis and general topology. In the first logic course with Church were studied several formal systems of Propositional Logic and first-order logic; some proofs of completeness and discussed part of the Löwenheim-Skolem theorems were revised, as well as a presentation of Gödel's proof on the completeness of first-order logic. In the second one, they dealt in great detail with a Second-Order system for Peano Arithmetic, as well as with the incompleteness of this axiomatic theory and the consequent incompleteness of second-order logic.

In 1941, the United States entered the Second World War, altering Henkin's plans. He had to rush his oral qualification exam, with which he obtained the degree of M. A. and left Princeton to take part in the Manhattan Project. This interruption would last four years, during which he contributed his mathematical knowledge working on radar problems and in the design of a plant to separate uranium isotopes. Most of his work required numerical analysis to solve partial differential equations. During this period, all of his work and readings on logic were completely suspended.

Once the war was over, Henkin returned to Princeton in 1946, where he was still required to write a dissertation to complete his Ph.D. studies. Upon his return, he joined the logic course that Church had begun a month earlier on Frege's theory of "sense and reference". In this course, he discovered Church's theory of types, which he found extremely interesting. The questions he asked about it eventually led him to give his proof of the completeness of the theory of types, which he was able to adapt to also give a new proof of the completeness of first-order logic. These results, as well as others that other that emerged from the same ideas, came to take part in Henkin's doctoral dissertation, which was titled "The completeness of formal systems", with which he graduated in June 1947. The dissertation itself was not published, although parts of it were rewritten and published. Many years later, Henkin wrote the article "The discovery of my completeness proofs", which contains a detailed review of the contents of his dissertation. The procedures used in it have become frequent methods of proof in various branches of logic.

=== After graduation ===
Having obtained his Ph.D. degree, Henkin spent two more years at Princeton working on post-doctoral studies. During this time, in 1948, he met Ginette Potvin, during a trip to Montreal with his sister Estelle and Princeton mathematics graduate student Harold Kuhn. Ginette would become his wife in 1950, a half year after Estelle married Harold. After completing his second year of postdoctoral studies at Princeton in 1949, Leon returned to California, where he entered the mathematics department at the University of Southern California. There he held the position of assistant professor until 1953.

In 1952 Tarski had managed to obtain a permanent position at Berkeley for Henkin. However, Henkin did not want to accept it, as he was sympathetic to the protests recently raised by the controversial oath of allegiance that had been required of university professors since 1950. Once the oath requirement disappeared, Henkin accepted Tarski's offer and settled in Berkeley in 1953.

=== Life in Berkeley ===
From 1953, most of Henkin's academic activity revolved around Berkeley, where he collaborated with a solid research group in Logic. He remained there for almost all his academic life, except for some periods in which he traveled abroad with scholarships and grants from diverse institutes, like the one-year stay he had in Amsterdam or the one in Israel with the Fulbright Research Grants he was awarded (in 1954 and 1979 respectively).

Henkin was always grateful to Tarski, as it was thanks to him that he was able to settle in Berkeley. After Tarski's death in 1983, he wrote in a personal letter: “I write to tell you that Alfred Tarski, who came to Berkeley in 1942 and founded our great Center for the Study of Logic and Foundations, died Wednesday night, at age 82 [...]. It was he who brought me to Berkeley in 1953, so I owe much to him personally as well as scientifically.”

Tarski not only offered Henkin a job opportunity but also provided him with a very fertile interdisciplinary collaborative environment for the development of Logic. Tarski had founded the Center for the Study of Logic and Foundations in Berkeley, but with Henkin's help, he was able to bring together a group of logicians, mathematicians and philosophers who formed the Group in Logic and the Methodology of Science, which is still active today. As part of this project they created an interdisciplinary postgraduate program culminating in a Ph.D. Tarski and Henkin boosted the project by organizing important congresses and conferences on Logic, following Tarski's conception of "logic as a common basis for the whole of human knowledge". The intense activity that took place in Berkeley in the 1950s and 1960s on metalogic was largely due to the activity of Tarski and Henkin, both in teaching and research. Many results of what are today crucial to Model Theory came as a result of the academic activity in Berkeley that took place in those years.

Among the research trips that Henkin did throughout the years are his visits to universities in Hanover, Princeton, and Colorado, as well as to several European Universities, such as Oxford (in the United Kingdom), and others in Yugoslavia, Spain, Portugal and France. In 1979, with his second Fulbright Grant, Henkin spent a year in Israel, in Haifa, at the Department of Science Education of the Technion University. On this occasion he also visited two universities in Egypt. In 1982 he first visited Spain. He gave conferences at several universities, including those in Barcelona, Madrid and Seville.

Henkin had an active role in research and teaching, but his activities at the university went far beyond that. In addition to the dedication he put in his teaching as well as in guiding the Group in Logic and the Methodology of Science, he held some administrative positions; he was director of the Department of Mathematics from 1966 to 1968, and subsequently from 1983 to 1985. One of the activities to which he devoted most energy was the teaching of mathematics, on which he also did some research.

On some occasions Henkin attended his children's schools to talk to elementary school children about maths, talking to them about "the negative numbers", or "how to subtract by addition". Around that time (about 1960), Henkin began to alternate his research work in mathematics with research work in teaching mathematics; the latter became increasingly frequent.

In 1991 he was granted the title of Professor Emeritus at the University of Berkeley and retired.

=== Retirement and death ===
After he retired, Henkin continued to work on math teaching projects. In 1991, he took part in a summer course program at Mills College intended to give talented women from across the nation an education in mathematics to prepare them for college. Finally, Ginette and Henkin moved to Oakland, where Henkin died a few years later, in November 2006.

One of the phrases that best captures the sentiment expressed in various testimonies of his students is that given by Douglas Hofstadter: "I feel very fortunate to have been his graduate student since I learned from him much more than logic. It is his humanity that conquered my heart. I always wish I am not less kind to my graduate students and no less eager to follow their professional growth after graduation than he was to me".

== Legacy ==
=== Algebra ===
Henkin's work on algebra focused on cylindric algebras, a subject he investigated together with Alfred Tarski and Donald Monk. Cylindric Algebra provides structures that are to first-order logic what Boolean algebra is to propositional logic. One of the purposes of Henkin and Tarski in promoting algebraic logic was to attract the interest of mathematicians to logic, convinced as they were that logic could provide unifying principles to mathematics: "In fact we would go so far as to venture a prediction that through logical research there may emerge important unifying principles which will help to give coherence to a mathematics which sometimes seems in danger of becoming infinitely divisible".

According to Monk, Henkin's research on cylindrical algebra can be divided into the following parts: Algebraic Theory, Algebraic Set Theory, Representation Theorems, Non-representable Algebraic Constructions and Applications to Logic.

=== Completeness theorems ===
In 1949 "The completeness of the first order functional calculus" was published, as well as "Completeness in the theory of types" in 1950. Both presented part of the results exposed in the dissertation "The completeness of formal systems" with which Henkin received his Ph.D. degree at Princeton in 1947. One of Henkin's best known results is that of the completeness of first-order logic, published in the above-mentioned 1949 article, which appears as the first theorem of the 1947 dissertation. It states the following:

Any set $S$ of sentences of $L$ formally consistent in the deductive system of $L$ is satisfiable by a numerable structure $M$.

This theorem is nowadays called the 'completeness theorem', since from it the following easily follows:

If $S$ is a set of sentences of $L$ and $\phi$ is semantic consequence of $S$ $(S \models \phi)$, then $\phi$ is deducible from $S$ $(S \vdash \phi)$.

This is the strong version of the completeness theorem, from which the weak version is obtained as a corollary. The latter states the result for the particular case in which $S$ is the empty set, this is to say, the deductive calculus of first-order logic is capable of deriving all valid formulas. The weak version, known as Gödel's completeness theorem, had been proved by Gödel in 1929, in his own doctoral thesis. Henkin's proof is more general, more accessible than Gödel's and more easily generalizable to languages of any cardinality. It approaches completeness from a new and fruitful perspective and its greatest quality is perhaps that its proof can be easily adapted to prove the completeness of other deductive systems. Other results central to model theory are obtained as corollaries of the strong completeness of the first-order logic proved by Henkin. From it follows, for example, the following result for a first-order language $L$:

Every set of well-formed formulas of $L$ that is satisfiable in a $L$−structure is satisfiable in an infinite numerable structure.

This result is known as the "downwards" Löwenheim-Skolem theorem. One other result obtained from the completeness theorem is:

A set $S$ of well-formed formulas of $L$ has a model if and only if each finite subset of it has a model.

The latter is known as the "compactness theorem" of first-order logic, which can also be phrased as: "Any set of well formed formulas of $L$ that is finitely satisfiable is satisfiable". This is to say, if for each of the finite subsets of $\Delta$ there is a structure in which all of its formulas are true, then there is also a structure in which all the formulas of $\Delta$ are true. It is known as the "compactness theorem" because it corresponds to the compactness of a certain topological space, defined from semantic notions.

Among the other theorems of completeness given by Henkin, the most relevant is perhaps that of the completeness of Church's Theory of Types, which is the first of the completeness theorems Henkin proved. Then, he adopted the method developed in that proof to prove the completeness of other deductive systems. This method has continued to be used to give proofs of completeness in both classical and non-classical logics, and it has become the usual proof of completeness for first-order logic in Logic textbooks. When Henkin published this result in 1949, completeness was not even part of the canonical subjects covered by the textbooks; some twenty years later, this theorem, along with its proof and corollaries, was part of virtually every Logic textbook. As for non-classical logics, Henkin's method can be used, among other things, to extend the completeness of Fuzzy Logic from first order to higher order, producing a complete Fuzzy Type Theory; it also offers a way to obtain results that link classical logic with intuitionist logic; and it allows one to test results of completeness in other non-classical logics, as in the cases of Hybrid Type Theory and Equational Hybrid Propositional Type Theory.

=== The discovery of the completeness theorems ===
Despite being one of his best-known results, Henkin got to the proof of the completeness of first-order logic "accidentally", trying to prove a completely different result. The order of publication of his articles and even the order of presentation of the theorems in his 1947 dissertation does not reflect the evolution that followed the ideas that led him to his completeness results. However, Henkin simplifies the difficult task of tracing the development and shaping of his ideas by his article "The discovery of my completeness proofs", published in 1996. In it, he describes the process of the development of his dissertation. He doesn't only explain the content of his work, but he also explains the ideas that led to it, from his first logic courses in College until the end of the writing of his thesis.

At the end of the war, Henkin returned to Princeton to complete his doctoral studies, for which he still had to write a dissertation containing original research. As soon as he arrived at Princeton, he attended Church's course in logic that had begun one month earlier, which dealt with Frege's theory of "sense and reference". Motivated by Frege's ideas, Church wanted to put them into practice through a formal axiomatic theory. To do so, he took the simple Theory of Types he had published a few years earlier and supplied it with a hierarchy of types, inspired by the idea of "sense" exposed by Frege. It was in this course that Henkin became acquainted with Church's Theory of Types, which he found of great interest. He immediately made a conjecture about it, whose proof he hoped could become his doctoral dissertation.

One of the attributes that drew Henkin's attention to Church's Theory of Types was that the $\lambda$-operator allowed to name many objects in the type hierarchy. As he explains in "The discovery of my completeness proofs", he set out to find out which elements had names in this theory. He began by exploring the elements that were named in the two domains at the base of the type hierarchy. He took $\N$ as the universe of individuals, and added a constant for each the number $0$ and the successor function $s$, so that each element in the domain was named from $0$ and repeated occurrences of $s$. Going up through the hierarchy, he tried to specify which functions over those elements were nameable. The set of them was supernumerable, so there had to be some without a name since there is only a numerable number of expressions. How could be said which elements were the nameable ones? To make each expression correspond to the element it denotated, he needed a choice function, in whose search Henkin invested many efforts. Finally, he realized that by means of the deductive calculus, he could form equivalence classes of expressions whose equality could be derived by the calculus, and form with these classes a model isomorphic to the new hierarchy of types formed by the named elements. He had been focusing on the interpretations of the formal language, when the key to solving the problem lied on the deductive system. It remained to make the universe of the objects named by the propositions a set of two elements: the truth values. This could be achieved by expanding the axioms to form a maximally consistent set. Once this was achieved, it could be proved that every consistent set of formulas $T$ has a model that satisfies exactly the formulas of $T$ – the elements of such model are the equivalence classes of the expressions themselves. That is, he would have managed to give a proof of the completeness of the deductive calculus.

The same method used to prove the completeness of Church's Theory of Types could easily be adapted to give a proof of (strong) completeness of first-order logic, and of others that followed later on. The ideas on the nameable elements in the hierarchy of types underlying the discovery of Henkin's completeness proofs led to the successful introduction of new semantics, called general semantics, which are based on general models (or Henkin models).

=== Henkin's method ===
Henkin's method to give the completeness proofs consists of building a certain model: it starts with a set of formulas $\Delta$, of which the consistency is assumed. A model is then constructed, which satisfies exactly the formulas of $\Delta$. Henkin's idea to build a suitable model relies on obtaining a sufficiently detailed description of such model using the sentences of the formal language, and to establish which objects could be the elements of such a model. If it were known, for each formula of the language of $\Delta$, if it should be satisfied or not by the model, we would have a comprehensive description of the model that would allow its construction. This is exactly what is being looked for: a set of sentences $\Gamma$ containing $\Delta$ for which it holds that every sentence of the language or its negation belongs to Gamma. In the case of first-order logic one more thing is required: that the set $\Gamma$ be exemplified, this is, for all existential formulas there is a constant that acts as a witness of it. On the other hand, since the nature of the objects that make up the model's universe is irrelevant, no objection arises against taking as individuals the terms of the language themselves –or classes of equivalence of them–.

The first step that must be taken is to extend the language of $\Delta$ adding an infinite collection of new individual constants, and then to order the formulas of the language (which are infinite). Once this is done, the aim is to inductively construct an infinite chain of consistent and exemplified sets: we start from $\Delta$, systematically adding to this set every formula that doesn't make the resulting set inconsistent, adding also exemplifications of the existential formulas. Thus, an infinite chain of consistent and exemplified sets is built, whose union is a maximally consistent and exemplified set; this will be the required set $\Gamma$.

Having achieved to construct this maximally consistent and exemplified set, the model described by it can be constructed. Which individuals constitute the model's universe? In the case of first-order logic without equality, the elements of the domain will be the terms of the formal language. To construct the functions and relations of the model we follow thoroughly what $\Gamma$ dictates: if the language contains an $n$-relator $R$, its interpretation in the model will be a relationship formed by all the $n$-tuples of terms in the model's universe such that the formula that says they are related belongs to $\Gamma$. If the language includes equality, the domain of the model is classes of equivalence of the terms of the language instead. The equivalence relation is established by the formulas of the maximally consistent set: two terms are equal if there is in $\Gamma$ a formula stating they are.

Summarizing, the demonstration in the case of a numerable language has two parts:

1. Extending the set $\Delta$ to a maximally consistent and exemplified set.
2. Constructing the model described by the formulae of this set using the terms of the language –or its equivalence classes– as objects of the model's universe.

=== General models ===
The simple Theory of Types, with the $\lambda$-calculus and the standard semantics is sufficiently rich to express arithmetic categorically, from where it follows, by Gödel's incompleteness theorem, that it is incomplete. Following the idea of identifying the namable elements in the hierarchy of types, Henkin proposed a change in the interpretation of the language, accepting as types hierarchies some that previously were not admitted. If it was asked from each level of the hierarchy not that there must be all the corresponding functions, but only those that are definable, then a new semantics is obtained, and with it a new logic. The resulting semantics is known as general semantics. In it the structures that are admissible as models are those known as 'general models'. These can be used not only in Type Theory, but also, for instance, to obtain complete (and compact) higher-order logics.

Obtaining complete higher-order logics by the use of general semantics meets the expected balance between the expressive power of a logic and the power of its deductive calculus. In second-order logic with standard semantics it is known that quantifying over predicative variables gives the language an immense expressive power, in exchange for which the power of deductive calculus is lost: the latter is not enough to produce the extensive set of valid formulas of this logic (with standard semantics). Changing the calculus does not solve anything, since Gödel's incompleteness theorem ensures that no deductive calculus could achieve completeness. On the contrary, by changing the semantics, that is, by changing the sets that form the universes in which the predicative variables and constants are interpreted, the logic turns out to be complete, at the cost of losing expressive capacity.

In second-order logic the set of valid formulas is so large because the concept of standard structure is too restrictive and there are not enough of them to find models that refute the formulas. By relaxing the conditions we ask of the structures on which the language is interpreted, there are more models in which the formulas must be true to be valid and therefore the set of valid formulas is reduced; it does so in such a way that it coincides with the set produced by a deductive calculus, giving rise to completeness.

=== Towards a translation between logics ===
One of the areas in which the foundations laid by Henkin's work have proved fruitful is in the search for a logic that works as a common framework for translation between logics. This framework is intended to be used as a metalogical tool; its purpose is not to choose "one logic" above the others, which would suppress the richness provided by their diversity, but to provide the adequate context to contrast them, understand them and thus make the best use of the qualities of each one.

A research that takes Henkin's ideas in this direction is that of María Manzano, one of his students, whose proposal is to use Many-Sorted Logic as a common framework for the translation of logics. The aims of this proposal can be synthesized into two: 1) to use a single deductive calculus for all of them; and 2) to use the metaproperties of Many-Sorted Logic in order to more easily proof metaproperties of other logics. In addition, having a logical framework is useful for comparing different logics by comparing the theories that represent them. Although Henkin does not speak of formulae translation, nor does he make explicit a Many-Sorted Language or calculus, the ideas he uses in two of his articles serve as a basis for the approach to translation: "Completeness in the theory of types" and "Banishing the Rule of Substitution for Functional Variables".

=== Mathematical induction ===
The topic of mathematical induction was frequently addressed in Henkin's activities on teaching. Probably his experience in this field was the result of his article "On mathematical induction". This was Henkin's favorite article of his own, of which he even wrote that he considered it his best expository article. In it he defined Peano Models as those that fulfill Peano's three Second-Order Axioms and Induction Models as those that satisfy the third of them: the induction axiom. He demonstrated that although all recursive operations can be introduced in the Peano models, this is not the case in the Induction Models. Concretely, there are Induction Models in which the exponentiation operation cannot be defined. In this article, Henkin also presents the mathematical structure that Induction models can have, which is quite simple: they can either be the standard model, that is, isomorphic to natural numbers, or in two more ways; isomorphic to cycles –which correspond to the $\Z$ integers module $n$; or isomorphic to what Henkin called "spoons", which is a combination of a finite list followed by a cycle.

=== Philosophical position ===
Of the articles published by Henkin, the most philosophical is "Some Notes on Nominalism", which he wrote in response to two articles on nominalism, one by Quine and the other jointly written by Quine and Goodman. The discussions relevant to this philosophical doctrine arise naturally in the proofs of completeness given by Henkin, as well as in his proposal for a change in semantics through general models. Both from the content of his works and from his own statements it is considered that his position was nominalist.

=== Teaching ===
Henkin's activity as a university professor was vigorous. He taught at all levels, putting the same care and dedication into each of them. Some of the courses he taught were directly related to his research area, such as "Mathematical Logic", "Metamathematics" or "Cylindric Algebra", but others extended to a great diversity of areas, including, among others, "Fundaments of Geometry", "Algebra and Trigonometry", "Finite Mathematics", "Calculus with Analytic Geometry" or "Mathematical Concepts for Elementary School Teachers". His students agree that his explanations were extremely clear and caught the listener's attention. In the words of one of his students, "part of his magic was his elegant expression of the mathematics, but he also worked hard to engage his audience in conjecturing and seeing the next step or in being surprised by it. He certainly captured the interest of his audiences."

One of the aspects of his lectures in which he put special care was finding an appropriate pace, facing the constant dilemma of how to find the optimal speed for learning. He considered it important that the students could follow the rhythm of the class, even if this meant that some would find it slow –they could continue at their own pace with the readings. However, he also considered that what was easily learned was easily forgotten, so he sought a balance between making his classes accessible and challenging for students so that they would make the effort to learn more deeply. About his own experience as a student, he commented in an interview: "That easy way in which ideas came made it too easy to forget them. I probably learned more densely condensed material in what we called the 'seminar for babies in conjunctive topology', conducted by Arthur Stone. I learned more because it forced us to do all the work."

In addition to his courses and supervision of graduate students, Henkin's role in the scholars' education was significant. Tarski had invited him to Berkeley with a clear purpose. As a mathematician, Henkin had a key role in Tarski's project to make Berkeley a center of development of logic, bringing together mathematicians, logicians and philosophers. Henkin aided him in carrying out the project, helping him in the creation of the interdisciplinary Group in Logic and the Methodology of Science, whose successful performance was largely due to Henkin's drive. Part of this project was the creation of an interdisciplinary university program that culminated in a Ph.D. in "Logic, Methodology and Philosophy of Science". He also collaborated in organising important meetings and conferences that promoted interdisciplinary collaboration united by logic. The outcome was that in the 1950s and 1960s, there was a vibrant development of logic in Berkeley, from which many advances in Model Theory emerged.

Although Henkin's first encounter with teaching mathematics was as a professor, later in life he began to do research in mathematics' teaching as well. Some of his writings in this field are: "Retracing Elementary Mathematics", "New directions in secondary school mathematics" or "The roles of action and of thought in mathematics education". From 1979 onwards he put special emphasis on this facet of his research and the last doctoral theses he directed are related to the teaching of mathematics or the integration of minority groups in research.

Henkin liked to write expository articles, for some of which he received awards such as the Chauvenet Prize (1964), for the article "Are Logic and Mathematics Identical?" or the Lester R. Ford Award, for the article "Mathematical Foundations of Mathematics".

== Social projects ==
Throughout his life, Leon Henkin showed a deep commitment to society and was often called a social activist. Many of his mathematics teaching projects sought to bring minority or socially disadvantaged groups closer to mathematics and related areas. He was aware that we are part of history and the context around us, as one of his writings records:

"Waves of history wash over our nation, stirring up our society and our institutions. Soon we see changes in the way that all of us do things, including our mathematics and our teaching. These changes form themselves into rivulets and streams that merge at various angles with those arising in parts of our society quite different from education, mathematics, or science. Rivers are formed, contributing powerful currents that will produce future waves of history. The Great Depression and World War II formed the background of my years of study; the Cold War and the Civil Rights Movement were the backdrop against which I began my career as a research mathematician, and later began to involve myself with mathematics education."

Henkin was convinced that changes could be achieved through education and, true to his idea, he committed himself to both elementary mathematics education programs and to programs whose aim was to combat exclusion. He showed a political commitment to society, defending progressive ideas. He inspired many of his students to become involved in mathematics education. Diane Resek, one of his students with an affinity for teaching, described him as follows:

"Leon was committed to work toward equity in society. He was able to see that professional mathematicians could make a difference, particularly regarding racial inequities in the United States. He was one of the first people to say that one thing holding back racial minorities and poorer people in America was their low participation rates in math/science careers. He believed that there were ways of teaching and new programs that could correct this problem."

Aware of the contributions that mathematicians could make through teaching, Henkin defended that teaching should be valued in the academy environment, as he expressed in a personal letter: "In these times when our traditionally trained mathematics Ph.D.’s are finding rough going in the marketplace, it seems to me that we on the faculty should particularly seek new realms wherein mathematics training can make a substantial contribution to the basic aims of society."

Some of the social projects he formed or participated in are the following. Between 1957 and 1959 he was part of the Summer Institutes, aimed at mathematics teachers and dedicated to improving high school and college education. In 1958 the National Science Foundation authorized the committee of the American Mathematical Society –which had been interested for some years in the use of films and visual material for mathematics education– to produce experimental films for this purpose, accompanied by printed manuals with appendices that would go deeper into the content and problems to be solved. Henkin participated in this project with a film on mathematical induction, whose supplementary manual was printed by the American Mathematical Society. The film was broadcast in the series "Mathematics Today". Between 1961 and 1964, he participated in a series of courses for elementary school teachers, organized by the Committee on the Undergraduate Program in Mathematics. Also around that time, he promoted the Activities to Broaden Opportunity initiative, which sought to provide opportunities for promising students from ethnic minority groups by offering them summer courses and scholarships. He took part in the SEED (Special Elementary Education for the Disadvantaged) program, which encouraged college students to participate in elementary education, as well as in SESAME (Special Excellence in Science and Mathematics Education), the interdisciplinary doctoral program created by members of various science departments, whose purpose was to research teaching and learning of science, engineering, and mathematics. Between 1960 and 1968 he participated in a series of conferences in mathematics schools, and was involved in the development of several films produced by the National Council of Teachers of Mathematics (NCTM). These films dealt with topics such as the integer system and the rational number system. He also participated in support courses for female calculus students and convinced the mathematics department to allow graduate students to receive the same financial support for working as elementary school teachers as they did for working as assistant teachers in college. "He not only believed in equality, but also worked actively to see that it was brought about."

== Henkin's main articles ==
- Henkin, L. (1949). The completeness of the first-order functional calculus. The Journal of Symbolic Logic, 14(3), 159-166.
- Henkin, L. (1950). Completeness in the theory of types. The Journal of Symbolic Logic, 15(2), 81-91.
- Henkin, L. (1953). Banishing the Rule of Substitution for Functional Variables. The Journal of Symbolic Logic, 18(3), 201-208.
- Henkin, L. (1953). Some interconnections between modern algebra and mathematical logic. Transactions of the American Mathematical Society, 74, 410-427.
- Henkin, L. (1953). Some notes on nominalism, The Journal of Symbolic Logic, 18(1), 19-29.
- Henkin, L. (1954) A generalization of the concept of $\omega$-consistency. The Journal of Symbolic Logic. 19(3), 183-196.
- Henkin, L. (1955) The nominalistic interpretation of mathematical language. Bulletin of the Belgian Mathematical Society. 7, 137-141.
- Henkin, L. (1955) The representation theorem for cylindrical algebras. En Skolem, Th., Hasenjaeger, G., Kreisel, G., Robinson, A. (Eds.) Mathematical Interpretation of Formal Systems, pp. 85–97.
- Henkin, L. (1957) A generalization of the concept of -completeness. The Journal of Symbolic Logic. 22(1), 1-14.
- Henkin, L. (1960). On mathematical induction. The American Mathematical Monthly. 67(4), 323-338.
- Henkin, L. (1961). Mathematical Induction. En MAA Film Manual No.1 The Mathematical Association of America, University of Buffalo, Nueva York.
- Henkin, L., Tarski, A. (1961) Cylindric algebras. En Dilworth, R.P. (Ed.) Lattice Theory. Proceedings of Symposia in Pure Mathematics. American Mathematical Society, 2, 83-113.
- Henkin, L. Smith, W. N., Varineau, V. J., Walsh, M. J. (1962) Retracing Elementary Mathematics. Macmillan, New York.
- Henkin, L. (1962). Are logic and mathematics identical?, Science, vol.138, 788-794.
- Henkin, L. (1963). New directions in secondary school mathematics. En Ritchie, R. W. (Ed.) New Directions in Mathematics, 1-6. Prentice Hall, New York.
- Henkin, L. (1963). An Extension of the Craig-Lyndon Interpolation theorem. The Journal of Symbolic Logic. 28(3), 201-216.
- Henkin, L. (1963). A theory of propositional types. Fundamenta mathematicae. 52, 323-344.
- Henkin, L. (1971). Mathematical foundations for mathematics. The American Mathematical Monthly. 78(5), 463-487.
- Henkin, L. (1975). Identity as a logical primitive. Philosophia 5, 31-45.
- Henkin, L. (1977). The logic of equality.The American Mathematical Monthly. 84(8), 597-612.
- Henkin, L. (1995). The roles of action and of thought in mathematics education –one mathematician's passage. Fisher, N.D., Keynes, H.B., Wagreich, Ph.D. (Eds.), Changing the Culture: Mathematics Education in the Research Community, CBMS Issues in Mathematics Education, vol. 5, pp. 3–16. American Mathematical Society in cooperation with Mathematical Association of America, Providence.
- Henkin, L. (1996). The discovery of my completeness proofs, Bulletin of Symbolic Logic, vol. 2(2), 127-158.

== Awards received ==
- 1964 — The Chauvenet Prize, Mathematical Association of America award to the author of an outstanding expository article on a mathematical topic by a member of the Association.
- 1972 — Lester R. Ford Award — for Mathematical foundations for mathematics, American Mathematical Monthly 78 (1971), 463–487.
- 1990 — First recipient of the Gung and Hu Award for Distinguished Service to Mathematics.
- 1991 — Berkeley Citation — the highest honor/award bestowed by the University of California.
- 2000 — Leon Henkin Citation — for Distinguished Service, which is presented to a (UC) faculty member for "exceptional commitment to the educational development of students from groups who are underrepresented in the academy."

== See also ==
- Branching quantifier
