= Mathology =

Mathology may refer to:

- a fictional religion from the American television series Young Sheldon
- a division of mathematics proposed by Paul Halmos
