= Carol Karp =

American mathematician (1926–1972)

- Born: Carol Ruth van der Velde; August 10, 1926; Forest Grove, Ottawa County, Michigan
- Died: August 20, 1972 (aged 46); Arlington, Virginia
- Occupation: Mathematician
- Known for: Languages with Expressions of Infinite Length (1964); Karp Prize

Academic background
- Education: Manchester University (BA, 1948); Michigan State University (MA, 1950); University of Southern California (PhD, 1959)
- Thesis: Languages with Expressions of Infinite Length (1959)
- Doctoral advisor: Leon Henkin

Academic work
- Discipline: Mathematician
- Sub-discipline: Mathematical logic; Formal language theory
- Institutions: University of Maryland, College Park (1959–1972)

Carol Karp, born Carol Ruth Vander Velde (10 August 1926 in Forest Grove, Ottawa County, Michigan – 20 August 1972 in Arlington, Virginia), was an American mathematician of Dutch ancestry best known for her work on infinitary logic. She also played viola in an all-women orchestra. She is the namesake of the Association for Symbolic Logic's Karp Prize.

== Early life and education ==
Karp was born Carol Ruth van der Velde on 10 August 1926 in Forest Grove in Ottawa County, Michigan to a farming supply store manager and a housewife. The family moved to Ohio when she was 11, and she and her siblings graduated from high school there. She graduated from Alliance High School in 1944. Next she attended Manchester University, Indiana, earning her Bachelor of Arts degree in 1948. She then went back to Michigan to study at Michigan State University (then called Michigan State College), where she earned a Master's degree in mathematics in 1950. She then spent time as a violist in an all-women orchestra before returning to mathematics.

In 1951 she married Arthur Louis Karp and took his last name. She continued her graduate study in mathematics while traveling to California and Japan with her husband, who worked in the US Navy. She completed her Ph.D. in 1959 at the University of Southern California under the supervision of Leon Henkin. Her dissertation, in formal language theory and infinitary logic, was Languages with Expressions of Infinite Length; she later published it as a book with the same title (North–Holland Publishing, 1964).

== Career ==
Even before completing her doctorate, Karp had taken a faculty position in 1958 at the University of Maryland, College Park, where her husband Arthur also taught. She was promoted to full professor in 1966 after only seven years and she became a "leader in the developing theory of infinitary logic". She was particularly known for applying methods of algebra to logic, thus advancing algebraic logic. In 1969 she was diagnosed with breast cancer but remained active until her death three years later on 20 August 1972 in Arlington, Virginia.

== Legacy ==
The Karp Prize of the Association for Symbolic Logic is named in her honor. The cash prize was established in 1973 and is awarded every five years for a "connected body of research, most of which has been completed in the time since the previous prize was awarded."
