= Derivative algebra =

In mathematics:

- In abstract algebra and mathematical logic a derivative algebra is an algebraic structure that provides an abstraction of the derivative operator in topology and which provides algebraic semantics for the modal logic wK3.
- In abstract algebra, the derivative algebra of a not-necessarily associative algebra A over a field F is the subalgebra of the algebra of linear endomorphisms of A consisting of the derivations.
- In differential geometry a derivative algebra is a vector space with a product operation that has similar behaviour to the standard cross product of 3-vectors.
