= Monadic Boolean algebra =

Boolean algebra extended with a unary operator representing existential quantification

In abstract algebra, a monadic Boolean algebra is an algebraic structure A with signature

⟨·, +, ', 0, 1, ∃⟩ of type ⟨2,2,1,0,0,1⟩,

where ⟨A, ·, +, ', 0, 1⟩ is a Boolean algebra.

The monadic/unary operator ∃ denotes the existential quantifier, which satisfies the identities (using the received prefix notation for ∃):

- ∃0 = 0
- ∃x ≥ x
- ∃(x + y) = ∃x + ∃y
- ∃x∃y = ∃(x∃y).

∃x is the existential closure of x. Dual to ∃ is the unary operator ∀, the universal quantifier, defined as ∀x := (∃x′)′.

A monadic Boolean algebra has a dual definition and notation that take ∀ as primitive and ∃ as defined, so that ∃x := (∀x′)′. (Compare this with the definition of the dual Boolean algebra.) Hence, with this notation, an algebra A has signature ⟨·, +, ', 0, 1, ∀⟩, with ⟨A, ·, +, ', 0, 1⟩ a Boolean algebra, as before. Moreover, ∀ satisfies the following dualized version of the above identities:

1. ∀1 = 1
2. ∀x ≤ x
3. ∀(xy) = ∀x∀y
4. ∀x + ∀y = ∀(x + ∀y).

∀x is the universal closure of x.

== Discussion ==
Monadic Boolean algebras have an important connection to topology. If ∀ is interpreted as the interior operator of topology, (1)–(3) above plus the axiom ∀(∀x) = ∀x make up the axioms for an interior algebra. But ∀(∀x) = ∀x can be proved from (1)–(4). Moreover, an alternative axiomatization of monadic Boolean algebras consists of the (reinterpreted) axioms for an interior algebra, plus ∀(∀x)' = (∀x)' (Halmos 1962: 22). Hence monadic Boolean algebras are the semisimple interior/closure algebras such that:

- The universal (dually, existential) quantifier interprets the interior (closure) operator;
- All open (or closed) elements are also clopen.

A more concise axiomatization of monadic Boolean algebra is (1) and (2) above, plus ∀(x∨∀y) = ∀x∨∀y (Halmos 1962: 21). This axiomatization obscures the connection to topology.

Monadic Boolean algebras form a variety. They are to monadic predicate logic what Boolean algebras are to propositional logic, and what polyadic algebras are to first-order logic. Paul Halmos discovered monadic Boolean algebras while working on polyadic algebras; Halmos (1962) reprints the relevant papers. Halmos and Givant (1998) includes an undergraduate treatment of monadic Boolean algebra.

Monadic Boolean algebras also have an important connection to modal logic. Monadic Boolean algebras are models of the modal logic S5 in the same way that interior algebras are models of the modal logic S4. That is, monadic Boolean algebras supply the algebraic semantics for S5. Hence S5-algebra is a synonym for monadic Boolean algebra.

== See also ==
- Clopen set
- Cylindric algebra
- Interior algebra
- Kuratowski closure axioms
- Łukasiewicz–Moisil algebra
- Modal logic
- Monadic logic
