= Abstract algebraic logic =

Aspect of mathematical logic

In mathematical logic, abstract algebraic logic is the study of the algebraization of deductive systems arising as an abstraction of the well-known Lindenbaum–Tarski algebra, and how the resulting algebras are related to logical systems.

== History ==
The archetypal association of this kind, one fundamental to the historical origins of algebraic logic and lying at the heart of all subsequently developed subtheories, is the association between the class of Boolean algebras and classical propositional calculus. This association was discovered by George Boole in the 1850s, and then further developed and refined by others, especially C. S. Peirce and Ernst Schröder, from the 1870s to the 1890s. This work culminated in Lindenbaum–Tarski algebras, devised by Alfred Tarski and his student Adolf Lindenbaum in the 1930s. Later, Tarski and his American students (whose ranks include Don Pigozzi) went on to discover cylindric algebra, whose representable instances algebraize all of classical first-order logic, and revived relation algebra, whose models include all well-known axiomatic set theories.

Classical algebraic logic, which comprises all work in algebraic logic until about 1960, studied the properties of specific classes of algebras used to "algebraize" specific logical systems of particular interest to specific logical investigations. Generally, the algebra associated with a logical system was found to be a type of lattice, possibly enriched with one or more unary operations other than lattice complementation.

Abstract algebraic logic is a modern subarea of algebraic logic that emerged in Poland during the 1950s and 60s with the work of Helena Rasiowa, Roman Sikorski, Jerzy Łoś, and Roman Suszko (to name but a few). It reached maturity in the 1980s with the seminal publications of the Polish logician Janusz Czelakowski, the Dutch logician Wim Blok and the American logician Don Pigozzi. The focus of abstract algebraic logic shifted from the study of specific classes of algebras associated with specific logical systems (the focus of classical algebraic logic), to the study of:

1. Classes of algebras associated with classes of logical systems whose members all satisfy certain abstract logical properties;
2. The process by which a class of algebras becomes the "algebraic counterpart" of a given logical system;
3. The relation between metalogical properties satisfied by a class of logical systems, and the corresponding algebraic properties satisfied by their algebraic counterparts.

The passage from classical algebraic logic to abstract algebraic logic may be compared to the passage from "modern" or abstract algebra (i.e., the study of groups, rings, modules, fields, etc.) to universal algebra (the study of classes of algebras of arbitrary similarity types (algebraic signatures) satisfying specific abstract properties).

The two main motivations for the development of abstract algebraic logic are closely connected to (1) and (3) above. With respect to (1), a critical step in the transition was initiated by the work of Rasiowa. Her goal was to abstract results and methods known to hold for the classical propositional calculus and Boolean algebras and some other closely related logical systems, in such a way that these results and methods could be applied to a much wider variety of propositional logics.

(3) owes much to the joint work of Blok and Pigozzi exploring the different forms that the well-known deduction theorem of classical propositional calculus and first-order logic takes on in a wide variety of logical systems. They related these various forms of the deduction theorem to the properties of the algebraic counterparts of these logical systems.

Abstract algebraic logic has become a well established subfield of algebraic logic, with many deep and interesting results. These results explain many properties of different classes of logical systems previously explained only on a case-by-case basis or shrouded in mystery. Perhaps the most important achievement of abstract algebraic logic has been the classification of propositional logics in a hierarchy, called the abstract algebraic hierarchy or Leibniz hierarchy, whose different levels roughly reflect the strength of the ties between a logic at a particular level and its associated class of algebras. The position of a logic in this hierarchy determines the extent to which that logic may be studied using known algebraic methods and techniques. Once a logic is assigned to a level of this hierarchy, one may draw on the powerful arsenal of results, accumulated over the past 30-odd years, governing the algebras situated at the same level of the hierarchy.

The similar terms 'general algebraic logic' and 'universal algebraic logic' refer the approach of the Hungarian School including Hajnal Andréka, István Németi and others.

== Examples ==
Logical system	Algebraic counterpart
Classical propositional logic	Boolean algebras
Intuitionistic propositional logic	Heyting algebras
Propositional modal logic	Boolean algebras with operators Modal algebras
First-order logic	Cylindric algebras Polyadic algebras Predicate functor logic
Set theory	Combinatory logic Relation algebra Boolean algebra

== See also ==
- Abstract algebra
- Algebraic logic
- Abstract model theory
- Hierarchy (mathematics)
- Model theory
- Variety (universal algebra)
- Universal logic
