= Wim Blok =

Dutch logician

Willem Johannes "Wim" Blok (1947–2003) was a Dutch logician who made major contributions to algebraic logic, universal algebra, and modal logic. His important achievements over the course of his career include "a brilliant demonstration of the fact that various techniques and results that originated in universal algebra can be used to prove significant and deep theorems in modal logic."

Blok began his career in 1973 as an algebraist investigating the varieties of interior algebras at the University of Illinois at Chicago. Following the 1976 completion of his Ph.D. on that topic, he continued on to study more general varieties of modal algebras. As an algebraist, Blok "was recognised by the modal logic community as one of the most influential modal logicians" by the end of the 1970s. He published many papers in the Reports on Mathematical Logic, served as a member on their editorial board, and was one of their guest editors. Along with Don Pigozzi, Wim Blok co-authored the monograph Algebraizable Logics, which began the field now known as abstract algebraic logic.

He died in a car accident on November 30, 2003.

== See also ==
- Abstract algebraic logic
- Blok–Esakia isomorphism
- Leibniz operator
