= V. S. Sunder =

Indian mathematician (born 1952)

Vaikalathur Shankar Sunder
- Born: 6 April 1952 (age 74)
- Education: IIT Madras, Indiana University Bloomington
- Awards: Shanti Swarup Bhatnagar Prize for Science and Technology
- Scientific career
- Fields: Subfactors, operator algebras, functional analysis
- Workplaces: Indian Statistical Institute, Institute of Mathematical Sciences, Chennai
- Doctoral advisor: Paul Halmos

Vaikalathur Shankar Sunder (born 6 April 1952) is an Indian mathematician who specialises in subfactors, operator algebras and functional analysis in general.

In 1996, he was awarded the Shanti Swarup Bhatnagar Prize for Science and Technology, the highest science award in India, in the mathematical sciences category.

Sunder is one of the first Indian operator algebraists. In addition to publishing about sixty papers, he has written six books including at least three monographs at the graduate level or higher on von Neumann algebras. One of the books was co-authored with Vaughan Jones, an operator algebraist, who has received the Fields Medal.

He received a Doctor of Philosophy from Indiana University Bloomington in 1977.
