= Derivative algebra (abstract algebra) =

Boolean algebra with a derivative operator capturing change or boundary behavior

In abstract algebra, a derivative algebra is an algebraic structure of the signature

<A, ·, +, ', 0, 1, ^{D}>

where

<A, ·, +, ', 0, 1>

is a Boolean algebra and ^{D} is a unary operator, the derivative operator, satisfying the identities:

1. 0^{D} = 0
2. x^{DD} ≤ x + x^{D}
3. (x + y)^{D} = x^{D} + y^{D}.

x^{D} is called the derivative of x. Derivative algebras provide an algebraic abstraction of the derived set operator in topology. They also play the same role for the modal logic wK4 = K + (p∧□p → □□p) that Boolean algebras play for ordinary propositional logic.
