= Cylindric algebra =

Algebraization of first-order logic with equality

In mathematics, the notion of cylindric algebra, developed by Alfred Tarski, arises naturally in the algebraization of first-order logic with equality. This is comparable to the role Boolean algebras play for propositional logic. Cylindric algebras are Boolean algebras equipped with additional cylindrification operations that model quantification and equality. They differ from polyadic algebras in that the latter do not model equality.

The cylindric algebra should not be confused with the measure theoretic concept cylindrical algebra that arises in the study of cylinder set measures and the cylindrical σ-algebra.

== Definition of a cylindric algebra ==
A cylindric algebra of dimension $\alpha$ (where $\alpha$ is any ordinal number) is an algebraic structure $(A,+,\cdot,-,0,1,c_\kappa,d_{\kappa\lambda})_{\kappa,\lambda<\alpha}$ such that $(A,+,\cdot,-,0,1)$ is a Boolean algebra, $c_\kappa$ a unary operator on $A$ for every $\kappa$ (called a cylindrification), and $d_{\kappa\lambda}$ a distinguished element of $A$ for every $\kappa$ and $\lambda$ (called a diagonal), such that the following hold:

(C1) $c_\kappa 0=0$

(C2) $x\leq c_\kappa x$

(C3) $c_\kappa(x\cdot c_\kappa y)=c_\kappa x\cdot c_\kappa y$

(C4) $c_\kappa c_\lambda x=c_\lambda c_\kappa x$

(C5) $d_{\kappa\kappa}=1$

(C6) If $\kappa\notin\{\lambda,\mu\}$, then $d_{\lambda\mu}=c_\kappa(d_{\lambda\kappa}\cdot d_{\kappa\mu})$

(C7) If $\kappa\neq\lambda$, then $c_\kappa(d_{\kappa\lambda}\cdot x)\cdot c_\kappa(d_{\kappa\lambda}\cdot -x)=0$

Assuming a presentation of first-order logic without function symbols, the operator $c_\kappa x$ models existential quantification over variable $\kappa$ in formula $x$ while the operator $d_{\kappa\lambda}$ models the equality of variables $\kappa$ and $\lambda$. Hence, reformulated using standard logical notations, the axioms read as

(C1) $\exists \kappa. \mathit{false} \iff \mathit{false}$

(C2) $x \implies \exists \kappa. x$

(C3) $\exists \kappa. (x\wedge \exists \kappa. y) \iff (\exists\kappa. x) \wedge (\exists\kappa. y)$

(C4) $\exists\kappa \exists\lambda. x \iff \exists \lambda \exists\kappa. x$

(C5) $\kappa=\kappa \iff \mathit{true}$

(C6) If $\kappa$ is a variable different from both $\lambda$ and $\mu$, then $\lambda=\mu \iff \exists\kappa. (\lambda=\kappa \wedge \kappa=\mu)$

(C7) If $\kappa$ and $\lambda$ are different variables, then $\exists\kappa. (\kappa=\lambda \wedge x) \wedge \exists\kappa. (\kappa=\lambda\wedge \neg x) \iff \mathit{false}$

== Cylindric set algebras ==
A cylindric set algebra of dimension $\alpha$ is an algebraic structure $(A, \cup, \cap, -, \empty, X^\alpha, c_\kappa,d_{\kappa\lambda})_{\kappa,\lambda<\alpha}$ such that $\langle X^\alpha, A \rangle$ is a field of sets, $c_\kappa S$ is given by $\{y \in X^\alpha \mid \exists x \in S\ \forall \beta \neq \kappa\ y(\beta) = x(\beta)\}$, and $d_{\kappa\lambda}$ is given by $\{x \in X^\alpha \mid x(\kappa) = x(\lambda)\}$. It necessarily validates the axioms C1–C7 of a cylindric algebra, with $\cup$ instead of $+$, $\cap$ instead of $\cdot$, set complement for complement, empty set as 0, $X^\alpha$ as the unit, and $\subseteq$ instead of $\le$. The set X is called the base.

A representation of a cylindric algebra is an isomorphism from that algebra to a cylindric set algebra. Not every cylindric algebra has a representation as a cylindric set algebra. It is easier to connect the semantics of first-order predicate logic with cylindric set algebra. (For more details, see § Further reading.)

== Generalizations ==
Cylindric algebras have been generalized to the case of many-sorted logic (Caleiro and Gonçalves 2006), which allows for a better modeling of the duality between first-order formulas and terms.

== Relation to monadic Boolean algebra ==
When $\alpha = 1$ and $\kappa, \lambda$ are restricted to being only 0, then $c_\kappa$ becomes $\exists$, the diagonals can be dropped out, and the following theorem of cylindric algebra (Pinter 1973):

$$c_\kappa (x + y) = c_\kappa x + c_\kappa y$$

turns into the axiom

$$\exists (x + y) = \exists x + \exists y$$

of monadic Boolean algebra. The axiom (C4) drops out (becomes a tautology). Thus monadic Boolean algebra can be seen as a restriction of cylindric algebra to the one variable case.

== See also ==
- Abstract algebraic logic
- Lambda calculus and Combinatory logic—other approaches to modelling quantification and eliminating variables
- Hyperdoctrines are a categorical formulation of cylindric algebras
- Relation algebras (RA)
- Polyadic algebra
- Cylindrical algebraic decomposition
