= Lindenbaum–Tarski algebra =

Concept in mathematical logic

In mathematical logic, the Lindenbaum–Tarski algebra (or Lindenbaum algebra) of a logical theory T consists of the equivalence classes of sentences of the theory (i.e., the quotient) under the equivalence relation ~ defined such that p ~ q exactly when p and q are provably equivalent in T. That is, two sentences are equivalent if the theory T proves that each implies the other. The Lindenbaum–Tarski algebra is thus the quotient algebra obtained by factoring the algebra of formulas by this congruence relation.

The algebra is named for logicians Adolf Lindenbaum and Alfred Tarski. Starting in the academic year 1926–1927, Lindenbaum pioneered his method in Jan Łukasiewicz's mathematical logic seminar, and the method was popularized and generalized in subsequent decades through work by Tarski.

The Lindenbaum–Tarski algebra is considered the origin of the modern algebraic logic.

== Operations ==
The operations in a Lindenbaum–Tarski algebra A are inherited from those in the underlying theory T. These typically include conjunction and disjunction, which are well-defined on the equivalence classes. When negation is also present in T, then A is a Boolean algebra, provided the logic is classical. If the theory T consists of the propositional tautologies, the Lindenbaum–Tarski algebra is the free Boolean algebra generated by the propositional variables.

If T is closed for deduction, then the embedding of T/~ in A is a filter. Moreover, an ultrafilter in A corresponds to a complete consistent theory, establishing the equivalence between Lindenbaum's lemma and the ultrafilter lemma.

== Related algebras ==
Heyting algebras and interior algebras are the Lindenbaum–Tarski algebras for intuitionistic logic and the modal logic S4, respectively.

A logic for which Tarski's method is applicable, is called algebraizable. There are however a number of logics where this is not the case, for instance the modal logics S1, S2, or S3, which lack the rule of necessitation (⊢φ implying ⊢□φ), so ~ (defined above) is not a congruence (because ⊢φ→ψ does not imply ⊢□φ→□ψ). Another type of logic where Tarski's method is inapplicable is relevance logics, because given two theorems an implication from one to the other may not itself be a theorem in a relevance logic. The study of the algebraization process (and notion) as topic of interest by itself, not necessarily by Tarski's method, has led to the development of abstract algebraic logic.

== See also ==
- Algebraic semantics (mathematical logic)
- Leibniz operator
- List of Boolean algebra topics
