= Aumann's agreement theorem =

Theorem in game theory

Aumann's agreement theorem states that two Bayesian agents with the same prior beliefs cannot "agree to disagree" about the probability of an event if their individual beliefs are common knowledge. In other words, if it is commonly known what each agent believes about some event, and both agents are rational and update their beliefs using Bayes' rule, then their updated (posterior) beliefs must be the same.

Informally, the theorem implies that rational individuals who start from the same assumptions and share all relevant information—even just by knowing each other's opinions—must eventually come to the same conclusions. If their differing beliefs about something are common knowledge, they must in fact agree.

The theorem was proved by Robert Aumann in his 1976 paper "Agreeing to Disagree", which also introduced the formal, set-theoretic definition of common knowledge.

== The theorem ==
The model of Aumann considers a finite set of states $S$ drawn according to a prior probability distribution $p\in\Delta(S)$, and two agents who initially share this prior belief. Agent $a$'s knowledge is given by a partition $\Pi_a$ of $S$; the interpretation is that when state $s \in S$ is drawn, agent $a$ learns (only) that the state lies in $\pi_a$, where $s \in \pi_a \in \Pi_a$. Let $\Pi_*$ denote the partition of $S$ that is the finest common coarsening of the separate agents' partitions $\big(\Pi_a\big)_a$. Then, we say that an event $E\subseteq S$ is common knowledge at a state $s\in S$ if $\pi_* \subseteq E$, where $s\in \pi_* \in \Pi_*$. Intuitively, this means not only that each agent $a$ is certain that $E$ occurred based on her observation $\pi_a$, but that she knows that other agents are certain based on their own observations, and that other agents are certain she is certain, and so on; $\pi_*$ captures what observations agents must contemplate in order to consider all levels of this hierarchy.

Aumann is interested in the situation where agents have common knowledge of each other's posterior beliefs. To this end, consider an event $E\subseteq S$. For each agent $a$ and observation $\pi_a\in\Pi_a$, let $p_a(E|\pi_a)$ denote $a$'s posterior belief that event $E$ occurred, i.e., $\sum_{s\in E\cap \pi_a} p(s) / \sum_{s\in \pi_a} p(s)$. Let $X$ be the event that for each agent $a$, we have $p_a(E|\pi_a)=x_a$ for some fixed number $x_a$.

In this model, Aumann's agreement theorem claims that if $X$ is common knowledge at some nonempty set of states, then all the numbers $x_a$ are the same. The proof is as follows. Let $s$ be a state where $X$ is common knowledge, and let $s\in \pi_*\in \Pi_*$. Fix an agent $a$ and consider all $\pi_a \in \Pi_a$ with $\pi_a\subseteq \pi_*$; for such we have $p_a(E|\pi_a)=x_a$. But $\pi_*$ is a union of such $\pi_a$s because for each $s' \in \pi_*$ there is $\pi_a$ so that $s' \in \pi_a \in \Pi_a$ and it satisfies $\pi_a \subset \pi_*$ by definition of a coarsening. Since the agent is fixed, summing $p_a(E|\pi_a)=x_a$ over all such $\pi_a$, we have that $p_a(E|\pi_*)=x_a$. Now, since $p_a(E|\pi_*)$ is independent of the identity of the agent, it follows that all numbers $x_a$ must be equal.

The theorem is not true when agents know each other's posteriors, but these posteriors are not common knowledge. For example, suppose the state is drawn uniformly from $S=\{1,2,3,4\}$, and let the two agents $a,b$ have $\Pi_a=\{ \{1,2\}, \{3,4\} \}$ and $\Pi_b=\{ \{1,2,3\}, \{4\} \}$. Consider event $A = \{1,4\}$ and state $s=1$. Then, agent $a$ observes (only) that the state is in $\{1,2\}$ has a posterior belief $1/2$ that $A$ occurred, and knows that agent $b$'s posterior belief that $A$ occurred is $1/3 \ne 1/2$. On the other hand, $b$ observes $\{1,2,3\}$, has a posterior of $1/3$, and knows that $a$'s posterior is $1/2$. However, according to $b$'s knowledge, it may be that $a$ thinks $b$'s posterior could be $1/3$ or $1$ (namely, if $a$ had observed $\{3,4\}$). Hence, in accordance with the agreement theorem, these posteriors are not common knowledge.

== Extensions ==
Monderer and Samet relaxed the assumption of common knowledge and assumed instead common $p$-belief of the posteriors of the agents. They gave an upper bound of the distance between the posteriors $x_a$. This bound approaches 0 when $p$ approaches 1.

Ziv Hellman relaxed the assumption of a common prior and assumed instead that the agents have priors that are $\varepsilon$-close in a well defined metric. He showed that common knowledge of the posteriors in this case implies that they are $\varepsilon$-close. When $\varepsilon$ goes to zero, Aumann's original theorem is recapitulated.

Nielsen extended the theorem to non-discrete models in which knowledge is described by $\sigma$-algebras rather than partitions.

Knowledge which is defined in terms of partitions has the property of negative introspection. That is, agents know that they do not know what they do not know. However, it is possible to show that it is impossible to agree to disagree even when knowledge does not have this property.

Halpern and Kets argued that players can agree to disagree in the presence of ambiguity, even if there is a common prior. However, allowing for ambiguity is more restrictive than assuming heterogeneous priors.

The impossibility of agreeing to disagree, in Aumann's theorem, is a necessary condition for the existence of a common prior. A stronger condition can be formulated in terms of bets. A bet is a set of random variables $f_a$, one for each agent $a$, such that $\sum_a f_a=0$ (the idea being that no money is created or destroyed, only transferred, in these bets). The bet is favorable to agent $a$ in a state $s$ if the expected value of $f_a$ at $s$ is positive. The impossibility of agreeing on the profitability of a bet is a stronger condition than the impossibility of agreeing to disagree, and moreover, it is a necessary and sufficient condition for the existence of a common prior.

== Dynamics ==
A dialogue between two agents is a dynamic process in which, in each stage, the agents tell each other their posteriors of a given event $E$. Upon gaining this new information, each is updating their posterior of $E$. Aumann suggested that such a process leads the agents to commonly know their posteriors, and hence, by the agreement theorem, the posteriors at the end of the process coincide. Geanakoplos and Polemarchakis proved it for dialogues in finite state spaces. Polemarchakis showed that any pair of finite sequences of the same length that end with the same number can be obtained as a dialogue. In contrast, Di Tillio and co-authors showed that infinite dialogues must satisfy certain restrictions on their variation. Scott Aaronson studied the complexity and rate of convergence of various types of dialogues with more than two agents.
