= Shamik Dasgupta =

Shamik Dasgupta may refer to:

- Shamik Dasgupta (philosopher)
- Shamik Dasgupta (writer)
