= Mutual knowledge =

Information known by all participatory agents

Mutual knowledge in game theory is information known by all participatory agents. However, unlike common knowledge, a related topic, mutual knowledge does not require that all agents are aware that this knowledge is mutual. All common knowledge is mutual knowledge, but not all mutual knowledge is common knowledge. Mutual knowledge can arise accidentally, due to a failure to design the game properly, so all players independently discover this mutual knowledge, or deliberately, due to the expected course of the game.

== The difference between mutual knowledge and common knowledge ==
The difference is crucial in a co-operation game. For example, in the game depicted below, with a random event determining the payoff matrix, both players, being fully rational, presume the more likely option to have occurred. However, suppose each player separately finds out that the random number, which was created privately and which determines the payoff matrix, was 1. However, neither are told that the other player is also aware of this.

Player A presumes Player B is not aware the random number is 1. They then observe that if the random number is 2-100, the best choice for B is always b1. So they choose a2, which would give them the best possible payoff in this matrix. Symmetrically, Player B presumes Player A expects the random numbers 2-100 and chooses a1, so B chooses b2. As a result, the players had a final result of (1, a2, b2), with a payoff of 1 for both - the lowest possible payoff (total or individual).

Now suppose that it is common knowledge that the random number is 1 - that is, both players are also aware that the other player knows the random number is 1, in addition to knowing this themselves. Given this, the best choice for A is a1, with an average of 6.5, and the best choice for B is b1, with an average of 6.5 also, giving an outcome of (1, a1, b1) with a payoff of 8 for both - the highest possible total payoff.

Common knowledge tends to lead to co-operative behavior more often than purely mutual knowledge, which can often lead to anti-cooperative behavior as shown in the example above, as the participants are aware that the knowledge is mutual knowledge and can all decide on behalf of this knowledge. This works best in a symmetric game, like the left matrix below.

The payoff matrices
A game	Random number: 1		Random number: 2-100	
Payoff (A, B)	A chooses option a1	A chooses option a2	A chooses option a1	A chooses option a2
B chooses option b1	8,8	10,5	3,4	2,3
B chooses option b2	5,10	1,1	4,3	3,2
