= Shamik Dasgupta (philosopher) =

Philosopher of science

Academic background
- Education: University College London (BSc); King's College London (MPhil); New York University (PhD)
- Thesis: Symmetry as a guide to reality (2009)
- Doctoral advisor: Kit Fine, Hartry Field, Stephen Schiffer
- Other advisors: Paul Horwich, Theodore Sider

Academic work
- Era: Contemporary philosophy
- Region: Western philosophy
- School or tradition: Analytic
- Institutions: University of California Berkeley; University of Princeton
- Main interests: Metaphysics, value theory, philosophy of science
- Website: https://shamik.net/

Shamik Dasgupta is an associate professor of philosophy at UC Berkeley, working primarily in the areas of metaphysics, value theory, and philosophy of science.

== Life and works ==
Dasgupta received his BSc in biology from University College London and his MPhil from King’s College London, with distinction. He received his PhD in 2009 from New York University, under the supervision of Kit Fine, Hartry Field and Stephen Schiffer. He subsequently became a professor of philosophy at Princeton University where he taught until 2016. In 2016 he was awarded a National Endowment for the Humanities (NEH) fellowship.

=== Selected publications ===
- 2016, Metaphysical Rationalism, Noûs, doi.org/10.1111/nous.12082
- 2014, The Possibility of Physicalism, Journal of Philosophy, doi.org/10.5840/jphil20141119/1037
- 2009, Individuals: An Essay in Revisionary Metaphysics, Philosophical Studies, doi.org/10.1007/s11098-009-9390-x
