= Stephen Schiffer =

American philosopher (born 1940)

- Born: 1940

Philosophical work
- Era: Contemporary philosophy
- Region: Western philosophy
- School: Analytic
- Main interests: Philosophy of language

Stephen Schiffer (born 1940) is an American philosopher and currently Silver Professor of Philosophy at New York University. He is a specialist in the philosophy of language.

== Education and career ==
Schiffer was awarded a Bachelor of Arts in philosophy from the University of Pennsylvania in 1962 and a Ph.D. in philosophy from Oxford University in 1970. He taught at the University of California, Berkeley, the University of Arizona, and the Graduate Center of the City University of New York before moving to the New York University Department of Philosophy. He was elected a fellow of the American Academy of Arts and Sciences in 2007.

== Philosophical work ==
He has specialized in the philosophy of language, and is the author of three significant works concerning semantic meaning: Meaning (OUP, 1972), Remnants of Meaning (MIT Press, 1987), and The Things We Mean (OUP, 2003).
