= Distributed knowledge =

Knowledge of a community of agents

In multi-agent system research, distributed knowledge is all the knowledge that a community of agents possesses and might apply in solving a problem. Distributed knowledge is approximately what "a wise man knows", or what someone who has complete knowledge of what each member of the community knows. Distributed knowledge might also be called the aggregate knowledge of a community, as it represents all the knowledge that a community might bring to bear to solve a problem. Other related phrasings include cumulative knowledge, collective knowledge or pooled knowledge. Distributed knowledge is the union of all the knowledge of individuals in a community of agents.

Distributed knowledge differs from the concept of Wisdom of the crowd, in that the latter is concerned with opinions, not knowledge. Wisdom of the crowd is the emergent opinion arising from multiple actors. It is not the union of all the knowledge of these actors, it does not necessarily include the contribution of all the actors, it does not refer to all the knowledge of these actors, and typically broadly includes opinions and guesswork. Wisdom of the crowd is a concept useful in the context of social sciences, rather than in the more formal multi-agent systems or Knowledge-based systems research.

== Example ==
The logicians Alice and Bob are sitting in their dark office wondering whether or not it is raining outside. Now, none of them actually knows, but Alice knows something about her friend Carol, namely that Carol wears her red coat only if it is raining. Bob does not know this, but he just saw Carol, and noticed that she was wearing her red coat. Even though none of them knows whether or not it is raining, it is distributed knowledge amongst them that it is raining. If either one of them tells the other what they know, it will be clear to the other that it is raining.

If we denote by $\varphi$ that Carol wears a red coat and with $\varphi \Rightarrow \psi$ that if Carol wears a red coat, it is raining, we have

$$(K_b\varphi \land K_a(\varphi \Rightarrow \psi)) \Rightarrow D_{a,b}\psi$$

Directly translated: Bob knows that Carol wears a red coat and Alice knows that if Carol wears a red coat it is raining so together they know that it is raining.

Distributed knowledge is related to the concept Wisdom of the crowd. Distributed knowledge reflects the fact that "no one of us is smarter than all of us."

== See also ==
- Common knowledge
- Dispersed knowledge
- Discipline (specialism)
- Knowledge tags
- Interactional expertise
- Crowdsourcing
- Collective problem solving
