= Henzinger =

Henzinger is a German surname. Notable people with the surname include:

- Thomas Henzinger (b. 1962), Austrian computer scientist and researcher
- Monika Henzinger (b. 1966), German computer scientist

== See also ==
- Henninger
