= Amir Goharshady =

Theoretical Computer Scientist

- امیر کفشدار گوهرشادی
- Born: March 1995 (age 31)
- Citizenship: Austria, Iran
- Education: University of Yazd (BSc); University of London (BA); Georgia Institute of Technology (MSc); University of Oxford (MA); Institute of Science and Technology Austria (PhD)
- Known for: Logic in Computer Science, Formal Methods, Blockchain
- Awards: ERC Starting Grant (2025); EAPLS Best PhD Dissertation Award (2022); Khwarizmi International Award (2019)
- Scientific career
- Fields: Computer Science, Mathematics
- Workplaces: Hong Kong University of Science and Technology; University of Oxford; Gran Sasso Science Institute; IIT Bombay; Ferdowsi University of Mashhad
- Thesis: Parameterized and Algebro-geometric Advances in Static Program Analysis (2020)
- Doctoral advisor: Krishnendu Chatterjee
- Website: https://www.cs.ox.ac.uk/people/amir.goharshady/ https://www.gssi.it/people/professors/lectures-computer-science/item/26238-goharshady-amir https://amir.goharshady.com

Amir Kafshdar Goharshady (Persian: امیر کفشدار گوهرشادی) is an Austrian and Iranian mathematician and theoretical computer scientist. He is a Professor at the Gran Sasso Science Institute and the University of Oxford and a fellow of St Catherine's College, Oxford. He is known for his work in formal methods, compilers and blockchain, as well as his history in informatics and mathematical Olympiads.

== Education ==
Goharshady was born in Mashhad in March 1995. He began university studies at the age of 16 and obtained his undergraduate degrees in computer science and mathematics from the University of Yazd and the University of London at the age of 19. He obtained his MSc from the Georgia Institute of Technology and completed his PhD in 2020 at the Institute of Science and Technology Austria, supervised by Krishnendu Chatterjee.

== Career ==
Previously, he was an assistant professor of computer science and mathematics at HKUST. In 2024, he joined the University of Oxford as an associate professor of computer science. He was promoted to professor and joined the Gran Sasso Science Institute in 2025. He has served as a Program Committee Chair for several international conferences in blockchain, including MARBLE and SETTA, as well as a Program Committee Member at AAAI, POPL, TACAS, PLDI, CAV, and ESOP. He is also a visiting professor at the Indian Institute of Technology Bombay and the Ferdowsi University of Mashhad, and served as an advisor and trainer to the Pakistani team at the International Olympiad in Informatics.

== Awards ==
- ERC Starting Grant, 2025
- ACM SIGPLAN Distinguished Paper Award - OOPSLA, 2024
- ACM SIGPLAN Distinguished Paper Award - OOPSLA, 2023
- EAPLS Best Dissertation Award, 2022
- IST Austria Outstanding PhD Dissertation Award, 2021
- Khwarizmi Award (Iranian Presidential Medal of Science), 2019
- IEEE Computer Society Larson Best Paper Awards, 2018 and 2019
- IBM PhD Fellowship, 2018
- Facebook PhD Fellowship, 2019
- International Mathematics Competition for University Students, Gold Medal (2015), Silver Medal (2014), Bronze Medals (2012-2013)
- ACM International Collegiate Programming Contest, World Finalist, 2025
- Southeastern European Mathematics Olympiad for University Students (SEEMOUS), Gold Medal, 2014
- Iranian Mathematics Competition for University Students, Silver Medal (2013), Bronze Medal (2012)
- Iranian National Olympiad in Informatics, Silver Medals (2011-2012)
