= Nemenman =

Nemenman is a surname. Notable people with this surname include:

- Ilya Nemenman (b. 1975), American theoretical physicist
- Mark Nemenman (b. 1936), Soviet computer scientist
