= Forrester's paradox =

Paradox of deontic logic created by James William Forrester

Forrester's paradox, also known as the paradox of gentle murder, is a paradox of deontic logic attributed to James Forrester. It is a version of the Good Samaritan paradox.

Forrester's argument is that, starting from the statements that:

- it is obligatory (under the law) that Smith not murder Jones, and
- it is obligatory that, if Smith murders Jones, Smith murder Jones gently,

it logically follows that:

- if Smith murders Jones, it is obligatory, that Smith murder Jones gently.

However, if it were actually the case that Smith murdered Jones, it can then be deduced that:

- it is obligatory, that Smith murder Jones,

which contradicts the first statement, leading to a logical fallacy.

A number of arguments have been advanced that Forrester's paradox is invalid, for example that it is the result of a confusion of scope, or a misuse of deduction rules.
