= Martin Hetzer =

Austrian-born molecular biologist

Martin Hetzer (born in Vienna, Austria) is an Austrian-born molecular biologist and President of the Institute of Science and Technology Austria (ISTA). He is holder of the Jesse and Caryl Philips Foundation Chair in Molecular Cell Biology. His research focuses on fundamental aspects of organismal aging with a special focus on the heart and central nervous system. His laboratory has also made important contributions in the area of cancer research and cell differentiation.

== Career ==
Hetzer received his Ph.D. in biochemistry and genetics from the University of Vienna, Austria, and completed postdoctoral work in the lab of Iian Mattaj at the European Molecular Biology Laboratory (EMBL) in Heidelberg, Germany. He joined the faculty at the Salk Institute in La Jolla as an assistant professor in 2004 and became full professor in 2011. In 2016, he was Salk's Senior Vice President and Chief Science Officer until he moved back to Austria in 2023, becoming the second President of the Institute of Science and Technology Austria (ISTA) succeeding Thomas A. Henzinger.

== Awards ==
Hetzer has received a number of awards including a Pew Scholar Award, an Early Life Scientist Award from the American Society of Cell Biology, a Senior Scholar Award for Aging from the Ellison Medical Foundation, a Senior Scholar Award from the American Cancer Society, a Royal Society Research Merit Award, the 2013 Glenn Award for Research in Biological Mechanisms of Aging and the 2015 NIH Director's Transformative Research Award as well as the Keck Foundation Research Award.
