= Nasim Amiralian =

Iranian legal scholar

- نسیم امیرعلیان

Academic background
- Education: University of Queensland (PhD), University of Guilan (MSc), University of Yazd (BSc)

Academic work
- Discipline: nanotechnologist
- Institutions: University of Queensland
- Main interests: nanofibers

Nasim Amiralian is an Iranian-Australian nanotechnologist and Senior Research Fellow at the University of Queensland where she is the Group Leader of Bio-inspired Materials Research at the Australian Institute for Bioengineering and Nanotechnology. Amiralian is known for her work on nanofibers. She is a winner of the ABC's 2018 Top 5 science communication program and Marie Claire's The Eight Australian Women Who Are Shaking up the World Of Science (2020).
