= Jozsef Csicsvari =

Hungarian neuroscientist

- Occupations: Neuroscientist and Professor of Neurosience

Jozsef Csicsvari is a Hungarian neuroscientist and Professor of Neuroscience at the Institute of Science and Technology in Austria. Csicsvari studies systems neuroscience and learning, particularly that of the hippocampus. Csicsvari uses electrophysiology to study place cells in the rat hippocampus. In 2010, the ad hominem title of Professor of Neuroscience was conferred upon him by Oxford University to recognise Csicsvari's "brilliant career".

In 2019 Csicsvari was elected to the Academia Europaea.
