= Tamás Hausel =

Hungarian mathematician

- Born: 1972 (age 53–54); Hungary
- Education: Eötvös Loránd University (BA & MA); University of Cambridge (PhD)
- Awards: Whitehead Prize (2008)
- Scientific career
- Fields: Mathematics
- Workplaces: University of Oxford; Institute for Advanced Study; Miller Institute; University of Texas at Austin; École Polytechnique Fédérale de Lausanne; Institute of Science and Technology Austria
- Doctoral advisor: Nigel James Hitchin
- Website: https://ist.ac.at/en/research/math-comp-sciences/hausel-group/

Tamás Hausel (born 1972) is a Hungarian mathematician working in the areas of combinatorial, differential and algebraic geometry and topology. More specifically the global analysis, geometry, topology and arithmetic of hyperkähler manifolds, Yang–Mills instantons, non-Abelian Hodge theory, Geometric Langlands program, and representation theory of quivers and Kac–Moody algebras.

Hausel is currently associated with the Institute of Science and Technology Austria (IST) where he has been a full professor since 2016. Prior to joining IST he was a professor at École Polytechnique Fédérale de Lausanne (EPFL). He was previously at the University of Oxford, both a Royal Society University Research Fellow at the university's mathematical institute, and a Tutorial Fellow in Mathematics at Wadham College. Previous to that, Hausel was an assistant and then associate professor at the University of Texas at Austin.

== Awards ==
In 2008, Hausel was awarded the Whitehead Prize by the London Mathematical Society for his investigations into hyperkähler geometry which have led him to prove deep results in fields as diverse as the representation theory of quivers, mirror symmetry and Yang–Mills instantons.

== Publications ==
- "MathSciNet".
- "ArXiv".
- Tamás Hausel. "Publication List". Archived from the original on July 19, 2011.
