= Krishnendu Chatterjee =

Indian computer scientist (born 1978)

- Born: 27 October 1978 (age 47); Kolkata, West Bengal, India
- Citizenship: Indian
- Education: IIT Kharagpur (BTech); University of California, Berkeley (MSc); University of California, Berkeley (PhD)
- Known for: Algorithmic Game Theory, Evolutionary Game Theory
- Awards: EACSL Ackermann Award (2008); David J. Sakrison Memorial Prize (2008); President of India Gold Medal (2001)
- Scientific career
- Fields: Computer Science
- Workplaces: University of California, Santa Cruz; Institute of Science and Technology Austria
- Thesis: Stochastic Omega-Regular Games (2007)
- Doctoral advisor: Thomas Henzinger
- Doctoral students: Amir Goharshady
- Website: http://pub.ist.ac.at/~kchatterjee/

Krishnendu Chatterjee (Bengali: কৃষ্ণেন্দু চ্যাটার্জী) is an Indian computer scientist who is currently a professor at the Institute of Science and Technology Austria (ISTA). He is known for his contributions to theoretical computer science, especially in algorithmic game theory, evolutionary game theory, logics and automata theory.

== Education ==
Chatterjee obtained his BTech in Computer Science and Engineering from the Indian Institute of Technology Kharagpur. He gained his MSc and PhD from the University of California, Berkeley. His doctoral advisor was Thomas Henzinger.

== Career ==
He obtained his PhD in 2007 and later moved to UC Santa Cruz for a postdoc. He then joined ISTA in 2009 as an assistant professor and was promoted to professor in 2014. In his research, he studies graph games with omega-regular and quantitative objectives, especially variants with probabilistic moves, multiple objectives, and/or partial information. Recently, he has also been applying computational methods to evolutionary game theory. He has described the computational complexity of various evolutionary processes, and he has extended models of direct and indirect reciprocity.

== Awards and honors ==
- 2001: President of India Gold Medal
- 2008: EACSL Ackermann Award
- 2008: David J. Sakrison Memorial Prize
- 2011: ERC Starting Grant from the European Research Council
- 2020: ERC Consolidator Grant from the European Research Council
