= Leonid Sazanov =

Professor at the Institute of Science and Technology Austria

Leonid Sazanov FRS
- Born: Leonid A. Sazanov
- Education: Belarusian State University (MSc); Moscow State University (PhD)
- Awards: EMBO Member (2018)
- Scientific career
- Fields: Structural biology Bioenergetics; Membrane proteins X-ray crystallography Electron microscopy
- Workplaces: Institute of Science and Technology Austria; MRC Mitochondrial Biology Unit; Laboratory of Molecular Biology; University of Cambridge; Imperial College London; University of Birmingham
- Website: ist.ac.at/en/research/life-sciences/sazanov-group/

Leonid A. Sazanov is a Belarusian scientist who is a professor at the Institute of Science and Technology Austria (ISTA). Sazanov research explores the structure and function of large membrane protein complexes from the domain of bioenergetics. These molecular machines interconvert redox energy and proton motive force across biological membranes using a variety of mechanisms.

== Education ==
Sazanov was educated at the Belarusian State University and Moscow State University, where he was awarded a PhD in 1990.

== Career and research ==
Sazanov is known for the discovery of the first atomic structure of respiratory complex I, using X-ray crystallography and the bacterial enzyme as a model. It is an entry point into the electron transport chain, responsible for most of the energy production in the cell. The complex I structure revealed many unexpected and unique features of this membrane protein assembly. Sazanov then went on to determine the first complete atomic structure of the even larger mammalian mitochondrial complex I, using new cryogenic electron microscopy methods.

Sazanov research investigates the coupling mechanism of complex I using a combination of structural and biophysical techniques. He is also interested in the structure and mechanism of other membrane-embedded molecular machines in mitochondria and bacteria.

Previously Sazanov served as program leader at the MRC Mitochondrial Biology Unit and research associate at the Medical Research Council (MRC) Laboratory of Molecular Biology. He has been a research fellow at Imperial College London and a postdoctoral researcher at the University of Birmingham.

=== Award and honours ===
He was elected a Fellow of the Royal Society (FRS) in 2019 and a member of the European Molecular Biology Organization (EMBO) in 2018.
