= Alternating-time temporal logic =

Type of temporal logic

In computer science, alternating-time temporal logic, or ATL, is a branching-time temporal logic that extends computation tree logic (CTL) to multiple players. ATL naturally describes computations of multi-agent systems and concurrent games. Quantification in ATL is over program-paths that are possible outcomes of games. ATL uses alternating-time formulas to construct model-checkers in order to address problems such as receptiveness, realizability, and controllability.

== Syntax ==
Let $\Pi$ be a set of atomic propositions and $\Sigma$ a set of agents. A coalition is a finite subset $A \subseteq \Sigma$ of agents. The formulas of ATL are generated by the grammar
$$\varphi ::= p
\mid \neg \varphi
\mid \varphi \lor \psi
\mid \langle\!\langle A\rangle\!\rangle X\varphi
\mid \langle\!\langle A\rangle\!\rangle G\varphi
\mid \langle\!\langle A\rangle\!\rangle(\varphi U\psi),$$

where $p \in \Pi$ and $A \subseteq \Sigma$.

Here $X$ is the next operator, $G$ is the globally or always operator, and $U$ is the until operator. The expression $\langle\!\langle A\rangle\!\rangle$ is a strategic quantifier: intuitively, $\langle\!\langle A\rangle\!\rangle X\varphi$ states that coalition $A$ has a strategy that guarantees that $\varphi$ holds at the next state, regardless of the actions of agents outside the coalition.

The dual strategic quantifier $[[A]]$ is defined by $[[A]] \psi \equiv \neg\langle\langle A\rangle\rangle\neg\psi$. While $\langle\langle A\rangle\rangle\psi$ states that coalition A can enforce $\psi$, $[[A]]\psi$ states that coalition A cannot avoid $\psi$.

The usual Boolean connectives, such as $\land$, $\rightarrow$, and $\leftrightarrow$, can be defined in the usual way. The eventually operator $F$ is derived from until; in particular, $\langle\!\langle A\rangle\!\rangle F\varphi \equiv \langle\!\langle A\rangle\!\rangle(\top U\varphi).$

Unlike in ATL*, temporal operators in ATL cannot be combined arbitrarily: each temporal objective is immediately governed by a strategic quantifier. The syntax is the same as computational tree logic (CTL), but quantifies over coalitional moves rather than branches of executions. The syntactical expressiveness difference between ATL and ATL* is mirrored in CTL and CTL*.

== Examples ==
One can write logical formulas in ATL such as $\langle \langle \{a, b\}\rangle \rangle F p$ that expresses the fact that agents a and b have a strategy to ensure that the property p holds in the future, whatever the other agents of the system are performing.

== Extensions and variants ==
ATL* is the extension of ATL, as CTL* extends CTL. ATL* allows to write more complex temporal objectives, for instance $\langle \langle \{a, b\}\rangle \rangle (F p \land G q)$. Belardinelli et al. proposes a variant of ATL on finite traces. ATL has been extended with context, in order to store the current strategies played by the agents. ATL* is extended by strategy logic.

ATL has been generalized to include epistemic features. In 2003, van der Hoek and Woodridge proposed ATEL: the logic ATL augmented with an epistemic operator from epistemic logic. In 2004, Pierre-Yves Schobbens proposed variants of ATL with imperfect recall.

One cannot express properties about individual objectives in ATL. That is why, in 2010, Chatterjee, Henzinger and Piterman introduced Strategy Logic, a first-order logic in which strategies are first-order citizens. Strategy logic subsumes both ATL and ATL*.

== See also ==
- Linear temporal logic
- Computational tree logic
- Strategy logic
