= Gašper Tkačik =

Slovenian physicist (born 1979)

- Born: 1979 (age 46–47); Ljubljana, Slovenia
- Education: University of Ljubljana; Princeton University
- Scientific career
- Fields: Theoretical physics
- Workplaces: Institute of Science and Technology Austria

Gašper Tkačik (born 1979) is a Slovenian theoretical physicist and computational neuroscientist.

== Life and work ==
After completing his International Baccalaureate from Bežigrad high school in Ljubljana, he enrolled in the department of mathematics and physics at the University of Ljubljana, where he received a Bachelor of Science degree in physics in 2001. He continued his studies at Princeton University with William Bialek and Curtis Callan where he received a PhD in physics. Later he was a postdoc at the University of Pennsylvania until he was employed at the Institute of Science and Technology Austria.
