= Carl-Philipp Heisenberg =

German biologist

Carl-Philipp Heisenberg (born 1968) is a German developmental biologist specializing in embryology, cell biology, and biophysics. He is the grandson of the physicist Werner Heisenberg and nephew of biologist Martin Heisenberg. He was born in Munich, Germany.

After graduating in Biology in Munich in 1992, he carried out his PhD work with Christiane Nüsslein-Volhard in Tübingen in 1997. After a postdoc with Stephen Wilson at University College London, he started his research group in 2001 at the Max Planck Institute for Cell Biology and Genetics in Dresden as an Emmy Noether junior professor. Since 2010, he is a professor at the Institute of Science and Technology Austria.

Heisenberg was elected member of the German National Academy of Sciences Leopoldina in 2015 and of the European Molecular Biology Organisation in 2016. In 2019, he received the Carus medal from the Leopoldina.

Heisenberg's research focuses on characterising the molecular, cellular and physical regulation of embryonic development. Using mostly zebrafish as a model organism, his group has identified how cytoskeletal and adhesive elements control the physical properties of tissues during gastrulation.
