= William Bialek =

American biophysicist (born 1960)

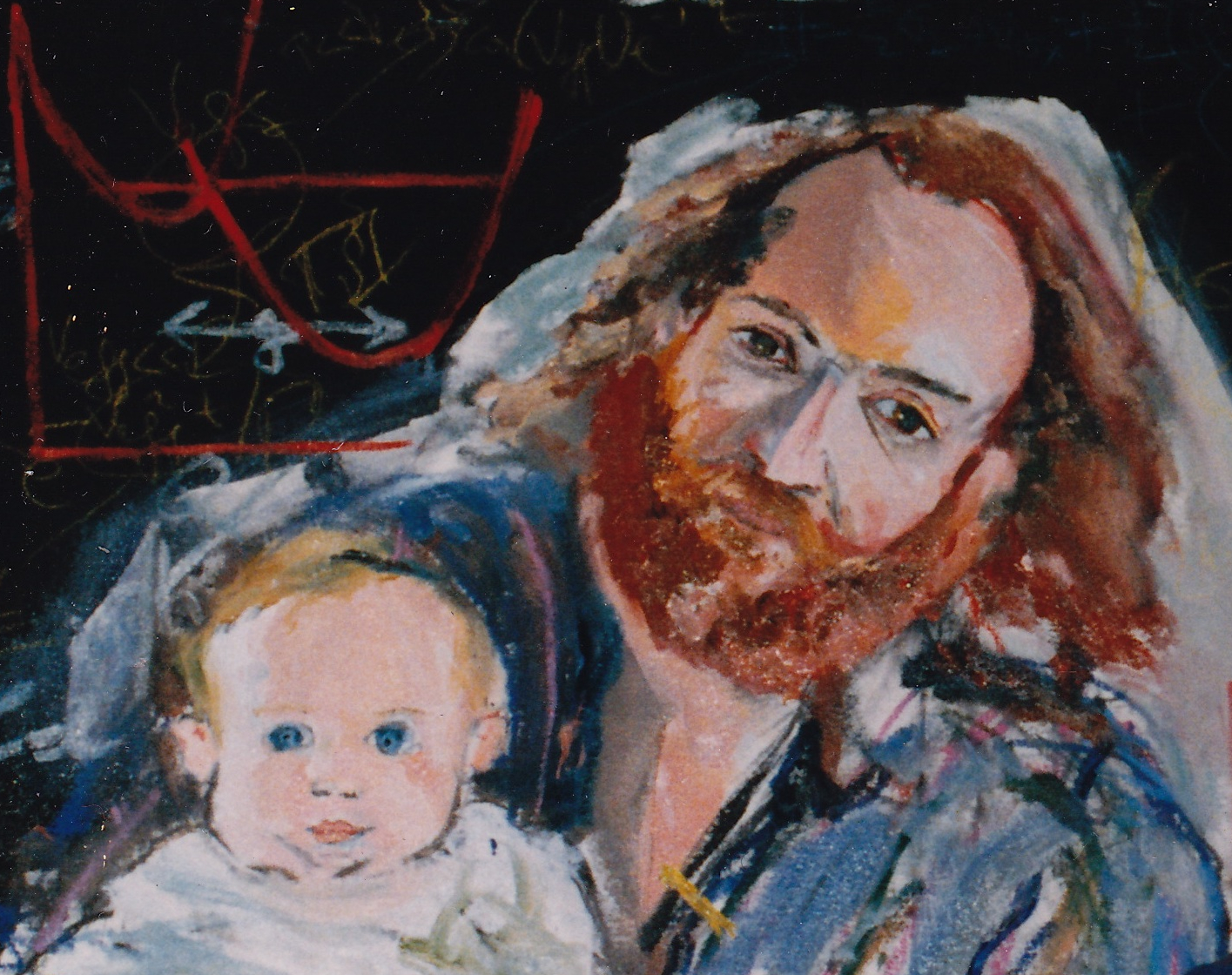
- Born: August 14, 1960 (age 66); Los Angeles, California
- Education: University of California, Berkeley
- Scientific career
- Workplaces: Princeton University; City University of New York
- Doctoral advisor: Alan Bearden
- Doctoral students: Dario Amodei; Leonid Kruglyak; Ilya Nemenman; Gasper Tkacik

William Samuel Bialek (born 14 August 1960) is a theoretical biophysicist and a professor at Princeton University and The Graduate Center, CUNY. Much of his work, which has ranged over a wide variety of theoretical problems at the interface of physics and biology, centers around whether various functions of living beings are optimal, and (if so) whether a precise quantification of their performance approaches limits set by basic physical principles. Best known among these is an influential series of studies applying the principles of information theory to the analysis of the neural encoding of information in the nervous system, showing that aspects of brain function can be described as essentially optimal strategies for adapting to the complex dynamics of the world, making the most of the available signals in the face of fundamental physical constraints and limitations.

Bialek received his AB (1979) and PhD (1983) degrees in Biophysics from the University of California, Berkeley. After postdoctoral appointments at the Rijksuniversiteit Groningen in the Netherlands and at the Kavli Institute for Theoretical Physics in Santa Barbara, he returned to Berkeley to join the faculty in 1986. In late 1990 he moved to the newly formed NEC Research Institute (now the NEC Laboratories) in Princeton. He is currently the John Archibald Wheeler/Battelle Professor in Physics at Princeton University, and a member of the multidisciplinary Lewis–Sigler Institute. In addition, he serves as Visiting Presidential Professor of Physics at CUNY Graduate Center.

Bialek has made contributions to shaping the education of the next generation of scientists, such as organizing the Princeton Lectures on Biophysics, a series of workshops that provided many young physicists with an introduction to the challenges and opportunities at the interface with biology. The textbook he coauthored, Spikes: Exploring the neural code has also been similarly used by many young physics students as an introduction to neuroscience. He is currently involved in a major educational experiment at Princeton to create a truly integrated and mathematically sophisticated introduction to the natural sciences for first year college students. Most recently, he published Biophysics: Searching for Principles, a textbook based on his course for PhD students.

== Honors ==
Bialek received the 2013 Swartz Prize for Theoretical and Computational Neuroscience from the Society for Neuroscience. A member of the National Academy of Sciences (US), he has also been honored for his teaching with the Phi Beta Kappa Prize and the President's Award for Distinguished Teaching at Princeton. In 2017, he won the Max Delbruck Prize, which is given by the Biological Division of the American Physical Society.
