= Marta Kwiatkowska =

Polish computer scientist living in the UK

Marta Kwiatkowska FRS MAE
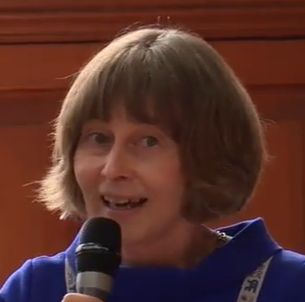
- Kwiatkowska in 2018
- Born: Marta Zofia Kwiatkowska; 1957 (age 68–69)
- Citizenship: British and Polish
- Education: Jagiellonian University (BSc, MSc); University of Leicester (PhD)
- Awards: Foreign member of Polish Academy of Sciences (2026); ETAPS Test-of-Time Tool Award (2024); American Academy of Arts and Sciences (2023); Van Wijngaarden Award (2021); Fellow of Royal Society (2019); BCS Lovelace Medal (2019); Milner Award (2018); ACM Fellow (2016); Honorary Doctorate, KTH (2014); Academia Europaea (2011)
- Scientific career
- Fields: Computer Science; Automated verification; Probabilistic quantitative model checking; Safety and robustness verification of deep learning
- Workplaces: University of Oxford; Polish Academy of Sciences; University of Birmingham; University of Leicester; Jagiellonian University
- Thesis: Fairness for non-interleaving concurrency (1989)
- Website: cs.ox.ac.uk/marta.kwiatkowska

Marta Zofia Kwiatkowska FRS MAE (born 1957) is a Polish theoretical computer scientist based in the United Kingdom.

Kwiatkowska is Professor of Computing Systems in the Department of Computer Science at the University of Oxford, England, and a Fellow of Trinity College, Oxford. She is also Professor (part-time) at the Institute of Computer Science, Polish Academy of Sciences, Warsaw. Her research focuses on developing modelling and automated verification techniques for computing systems in order to guarantee safe, secure, reliable, timely and resource-efficient operation. More recently, she has broadened her activities to studying safety and robustness of deep learning.

== Education ==
Kwiatkowska received her Bachelor of Science and Master of Science degrees in Computer Science with distinction summa cum laude from Jagiellonian University in Kraków, Poland. She obtained her PhD in Computer Science from the University of Leicester in 1989.

== Career and research ==
After obtaining her PhD, Kwiatkowska was assistant professor at Jagiellonian University, (1980–1988); research scholar and lecturer in Computer Science at University of Leicester (1984–1994); and lecturer in Computer Science, reader in Semantics for Concurrency, and professor of Computer Science at University of Birmingham (1994–2007). Joining the University of Oxford in 2007, Kwiatkowska was the first female professor in the Department of Computer Science and now heads the Automated Verification research theme.

Kwiatkowska's research develops models and analysis methods for complex systems, as found in computer networks, biological organisms and electronic devices. Kwiatkowska led development of the PRISM probabilistic model checker; PRISM has been downloaded over 100,000 times and there are over 700 papers by external research teams using PRISM (as at February 2026).

Instrumental in the development of probabilistic and quantitative methods in verification on the international scene, Kwiatkowska’s recent work incorporates synthesis from quantitative specifications with a focus on safety and robustness for machine learning and AI. As a past member of the Global Partnership on Artificial Intelligence (GPAI) 'Responsible AI Working Group', and the Royal Society's 'Digital Technology and the Planet Working Group', Kwiatkowska advocates responsible adoption of trustworthy AI.

As a senior member of OxWoCS, contributor to the Perspektywy Women in Tech Summit and adviser to the Suffrage Science Award (2016), Kwiatkowska encourages women to pursue careers in science.

Kwiatkowska has served on the editorial boards of ACM Books, Information and Computation, Formal Methods in System Design, Logical Methods in Computer Science, Science of Computer Programming and the Royal Society's Open Science.

=== Selected projects ===
- FUN2MODEL: From FUNction-based TO MOdel-based automated probabilistic reasoning for DEep Learning (2019–2024), a European Research Council (ERC) Advanced Grant.
- Mathematical foundations of intelligence: an 'Erlangen Programme' for AI (2024–29), an EPSRC grant. Co-investigator.
- ELSA: European Lighthouse on Secure and Safe AI (2022–26). Associate partner (European network).
- FAIR: Framework for responsible adoption of Artificial Intelligence in the financial services industry (2021-2026). EPSRC Partnership. Co-investigator.
- Mobile Autonomy: Enabling a Pervasive Technology of the Future (2015–2021), an Engineering and Physical Sciences Research Council (EPSRC) Programme Grant (co-I).
- VERIWARE: From software verification to everyware verification (2010-2015), a European Research Council (ERC) Advanced Grant.

=== Selected talks and lectures ===
- 'Provably robust artificial intelligence? A formal methods perspective'', https://ecai2025.org/ ECAI 2025, Bologna, October 2025.
- ‘Stochastic Games with Neural Perception Mechanisms: A Formal Methods Perspective’ at the GameSec 2025 Conference on Game Theory and AI for Security, Athens, October 2025. See GameSec 2025: Bridging Game Theory and AI for a Secure Future
- 'Marta Kwiatkowska interviewed by Maciej Kawecki', 2025
- ‘Adversarial robustness certification for neural networks: progress and challenges’, Formal Methods 2024 conference, Milan, September 2024.
- 'Probabilistic Model Checking for the Data-Rich World' BCS 2020 Lovelace Lecture, on-line event, May 2021.
- 'When to Trust a Self-Driving Car...' – Milner Award Prize Lecture, November 2018.
- 'When to trust a robot' – Hay Festival talk on 30 May 2017.

== Awards and honours ==
- Foreign member of the Polish Academy of Sciences, 2026.
- TOP 100 Women in Engineering, Poland, 2025.
- ETAPS Test-of-Time Tool Award for PRISM Creators, 2024. Joint with David Parker and Gethin Norman.
- International Honorary Member, American Academy of Arts and Sciences (AAAS), 2023.
- Van Wijngaarden Award 2021, five-yearly award established by CWI, for research into “preventing software faults”.
- Professor, honorary title awarded by the President of Poland, 2020.
- Fellow of the European Laboratory for Learning and Intelligent Systems (ELLIS Society), 2020.
- Awarded the BCS Ada Lovelace Medal for 'her research in probabilistic and quantitative verification. Since 2001 she has led the development of the highly influential probabilistic model checker PRISM', 2019.
- Fellow of the Royal Society, (FRS) for ‘contribution to the theoretical and practical development of stochastic and quantitative model checking’, 2019.
- Became the first female winner of the Royal Society Milner Award in recognition of ‘her contribution to the theoretical and practical development of stochastic and quantitative model checking’, 2018.
- Fellow, Polish Society of Arts & Sciences Abroad, 2017.
- Fellow of EATCS (European Association of Theoretical Computer Science), 2017.
- Jointly awarded the HVC 2016 Award for her ‘contributions to probabilistic model checking and, more generally, to formal verification’, 2016.
- Awarded Honorary Doctorate by KTH Institute of Technology, Stockholm, 21 November 2014, for being ‘the driving force for the development of probabilistic and quantitative methods within computer science,’ 2014.
- Fellow of ACM (Association for Computing Machinery) ‘for fundamental contributions to the theory and practice of probabilistic verification and its applications’, 2016.
- Elected Member, Academia Europaea, 2011.
- Fellow of the British Computer Society, 2008.
