= Imperative logic =

Field of logic concerned with imperatives

Imperative logic is the field of logic concerned with imperatives. In contrast to declaratives, it is not clear whether imperatives denote propositions or more generally what role truth and falsity play in their semantics. Thus, there is almost no consensus on any aspect of imperative logic.

== Jørgensen's dilemma ==
One of a logic's principal concerns is logical validity. It seems that arguments with imperatives can be valid. Consider:

P1. Take all the books off the table!
P2. Foundations of Arithmetic is on the table.
C1. Therefore, take Foundations of Arithmetic off the table!

However, an argument is valid if the conclusion follows from the premises. This means the premises give us reason to believe the conclusion, or, alternatively, the truth of the premises determines truth of the conclusion. Since imperatives are neither true nor false and since they are not proper objects of belief, none of the standard accounts of logical validity apply to arguments containing imperatives.

Here is the dilemma. Either arguments containing imperatives can be valid or not. On the one hand, if such arguments can be valid, we need a new or expanded account of logical validity and the concomitant details. Providing such an account has proved challenging. On the other hand, if such arguments cannot be valid (either because such arguments are all invalid or because validity is not a notion that applies to imperatives), then our logical intuitions regarding the above argument (and others similar to it) are mistaken. Since either answer seems problematic, this has come to be known as Jørgensen's dilemma, named after Jørgen Jørgensen (da).

While this problem was first noted in a footnote by Frege, it received a more developed formulation by Jørgensen.

Deontic logic takes the approach of adding a modal operator $O$ to an argument with imperatives such that a truth-value can be assigned to the proposition. For example, it may be hard to assign a truth-value to the argument "Take all the books off the table!", but $O$ ("Take all the books off the table"), which means "It is obligatory to take all the books off the table", can be assigned a truth-value, because it is in the indicative mood.

== Ross's paradox ==
Alf Ross observed that applying the classical rule of disjunction introduction under the scope of an imperative operator leads to unintuitive (or apparently absurd) results. When applied to simple declaratives, the result appears to be valid deduction.

P1. The room is clean.
C1. Therefore, the room is clean or grass is green.

However, a similar inference does not seem to be valid for imperatives. Consider:

P1. Clean your room!
C1. Therefore, clean your room or burn the house down!

Ross's paradox highlights the challenge faced by anyone who wants to modify or add to the standard account of validity. The challenge is what we mean by a valid imperative inference. For valid declarative inference, the premises give you a reason to believe the conclusion. One might think that for imperative inference, the premises give you a reason to do as the conclusion says. While Ross's paradox seems to suggest otherwise, its severity has been subject of much debate.

The semantics for deontic logic requires that all obligations in the domain of discourse be fulfilled in an acceptable possible world. The conclusion "It is obligatory to clean your room or burn the house down" does not falsify the premise "It is obligatory to clean your room." In addition, based on the context, it may also be true that "It is obligatory to not burn the house down", in which case any acceptable possible world must have "Your room is cleaned" and "The house is not burnt down" to be both true.

Some strands of this debate connect it to Hans Kamp's paradox of free choice, in which disjunction introduction leads to absurd conclusions when applied under the scope of a possibility modal.

== Mixed inferences ==
The following is an example of a pure imperative inference:

P1. Do both of the following: wash the dishes and clean your room!
C1. Therefore, clean your room!

In this case, all the sentences making up the argument are imperatives. Not all imperative inferences are of this kind. Consider again:

P1. Take all the books off the table!
P2. Foundations of Arithmetic is on the table.
C1. Therefore, take Foundations of Arithmetic off the table!

Notice that this argument is composed of both imperatives and declaratives and has an imperative conclusion.

Mixed inferences are of special interest to logicians. For instance, Henri Poincaré held that no imperative conclusion can be validly drawn from a set of premises which does not contain at least one imperative. While R.M. Hare held that no declarative conclusion can be validly drawn from a set of premises which cannot validly be drawn from the declaratives among them alone. There is no consensus among logicians about the truth or falsity of these (or similar) claims and mixed imperative and declarative inference remains vexed.

== Applications ==
Aside from intrinsic interest, imperative logic has other applications. The use of imperatives in moral theory should make imperative inference an important subject for ethics and metaethics.

== See also ==
- Deontic logic
- Free choice inference
- List of Logical Paradoxes
- Speech acts
- Pragmatics
- Temporal logic
