= Brian Chellas =

American philosopher and logician (1941–2023)

Brian F. Chellas
- Born: Brian Farrell Chellas; October 7, 1941; New York City, U.S.
- Died: March 1, 2023 (aged 81); Calgary, Alberta, Canada

Academic background
- Education: Stanford University (PhD)
- Thesis: 'The Logical Form of Imperatives' (1969)
- Doctoral advisor: Dana Scott

Academic work
- Discipline: Philosophy
- Sub-discipline: Philosophical logic, modal logic
- School or tradition: Analytic philosophy
- Institutions: University of Pennsylvania; University of Calgary
- Main interests: Modal logic; Deontic logic; Conditional logic; Logic of imperatives; Logic of agency
- Notable works: The Logical Form of Imperatives (1969); Modal Logic: An Introduction (1980)

Brian Farrell Chellas (October 7, 1941 – March 1, 2023) was an American philosopher and logician, known for his work in modal logic, deontic logic, conditional logic, and the logic of agency. He was a long-time member of the Department of Philosophy at the University of Calgary, where he became professor emeritus, and is widely recognized for the textbook Modal Logic: An Introduction (1980).

== Education and career ==
Chellas was born in New York City on 7 October 1941. He studied at Stanford University, completing his PhD in philosophy in 1969 with the dissertation The Logical Form of Imperatives under the supervision of Dana Scott. The dissertation, published by Perry Lane Press, became an early point of reference in the formal study of imperatives.

In the early 1970s he taught at the University of Pennsylvania, where he served as assistant professor of philosophy and was involved in faculty governance. During this period his papers in Theoria and the Journal of Philosophical Logic list the University of Pennsylvania as his institutional affiliation.

By the late 1970s and early 1980s Chellas had moved to Canada. He joined the Department of Philosophy at the University of Calgary, where he spent the remainder of his academic career and later became emeritus professor. His Calgary affiliation is recorded on many of his later papers, including work on the logic of agency and on non-normal modal logics.

Chellas died on 1 March 2023 in Calgary, Alberta, at the age of 81.

== Philosophical work ==
Much of Chellas's work lies in philosophical logic, especially modal, deontic, and conditional logics, and in formal theories of agency.

His early research focused on the logic of imperatives. In The Logical Form of Imperatives and the article "Imperatives" in Theoria he developed semantic and proof-theoretic treatments of imperative sentences, influencing subsequent surveys of the logic of imperatives.

Chellas is widely credited with introducing and systematically studying "basic conditional logic", usually denoted CK, in his 1975 paper "Basic conditional logic". CK serves as a foundational system in the modern theory of conditional logics and is frequently used as a starting point in later work on connexive and other non-classical conditionals. Closely connected is his work on neighborhood semantics and "neighborhood canonicity" for non-normal modal logics, which later authors explicitly attribute to him.

In deontic logic and the formal theory of obligation, Chellas's chapter "Conditional Obligation" became a standard point of reference in discussions of conditional norms and detachment principles. Later surveys of deontic modals and deontic logic discuss his systems as important alternatives to more classical approaches.

Chellas also made influential contributions to the logic of agency. In "Time and modality in the logic of agency" he studied temporal and modal aspects of so-called STIT ("sees to it that") operators and their interaction with branching-time semantics. Later work in deontic and agency logics explicitly traces the 'cstit' operator for seeing-to-it-that to a notion introduced by Chellas in his 1969 dissertation.

Together with Krister Segerberg, he developed non-normal modal logics and neighborhood semantics further, notably in "Modal logics with the MacIntosh rule" and "Modal Logics in the Vicinity of S1". These papers remain standard references in the literature on non-normal and Lewis-style modal systems.

Chellas's textbook Modal Logic: An Introduction (1980) is a widely used introduction to contemporary modal logic, covering normal and non-normal systems, completeness and decidability results, and applications to deontic and conditional logics. It has remained a standard reference in both philosophy and computer science.

== Personal life ==
Obituaries report that Chellas was married to Merry Chellas and had one daughter, the screenwriter and director Semi Chellas.

== Selected publications ==
- The Logical Form of Imperatives (PhD dissertation, Stanford University, 1969).
- "Imperatives", Theoria 37 (2) (1971): 114–129.
- "Notions of relevance: Comments on Leblanc's paper", Journal of Philosophical Logic 1 (3–4) (1972): 287–293.
- "Conditional Obligation", in Sören Stenlund (ed.), Logical Theory and Semantic Analysis (Dordrecht: D. Reidel, 1974), 23–45.
- "Basic conditional logic", Journal of Philosophical Logic 4 (2) (1975): 133–153.
- Modal Logic: An Introduction (Cambridge: Cambridge University Press, 1980).
- "Time and modality in the logic of agency", Studia Logica 51 (3–4) (1992): 485–517.
- "Modal logics with the MacIntosh rule" (with Krister Segerberg), Journal of Philosophical Logic 23 (1) (1994): 67–86.
- "On bringing it about", Journal of Philosophical Logic 24 (6) (1995): 563–571.
- "Modal Logics in the Vicinity of S1" (with Krister Segerberg), Notre Dame Journal of Formal Logic 37 (1) (1996): 1–24.

== See also ==
- Modal logic
- Deontic logic
- Conditional logic
- Logic of agency
