= Milner Award =

European computer science award

Royal Society Milner Award and Lecture
- Awarded for: "outstanding achievement in computer science by a European researcher"
- Presented by: The Royal Society
- Reward: £5,000
- First award: 2012
- Website: Milner Award and Lecture

The Royal Society Milner Award, formally the Royal Society Milner Award and Lecture, is awarded annually by the Royal Society, a London-based learned society, for "outstanding achievement in computer science by a European researcher". The award is supported by Microsoft Research and is named in honour of Robin Milner, a prolific pioneer in computer science who, among other contributions, designed LCF and the programming language ML.

Recipients should be active researchers in computer science who are either European or have resided in Europe for at least 12 months prior to their nomination. Winners receive a bronze medal and a personal prize of £5,000 and are invited to deliver a public lecture on their research at the Society. The Council of the Royal Society chooses recipients on the recommendation of the Milner Award Committee. The committee is made up of Fellows of the Royal Society, Members of the Académie des sciences (France), and Members of Leopoldina (Germany).

Preceding the Milner Award was the Royal Society and Académie des sciences Microsoft Award, which rewarded scientists in Europe for advancements in science using computational methods. It lasted from 2006 to 2009 until it was replaced by the current award. The ACM SIGPLAN Robin Milner Young Researcher Award is a similar award rewarded for "outstanding contributions by young investigators in the area of programming languages".

== Recipients ==
The inaugural winner Gordon Plotkin received his prize in 2012 but delivered his public lecture in 2013, the same year as Serge Abiteboul. In 2018, Marta Kwiatkowska became the first female recipient of the award. Although the 2019 recipient Eugene Myers is American, he moved to Dresden, Germany, in 2012 to become a director of the Max Planck Institute of Molecular Cell Biology and Genetics, thus meeting the criteria for a researcher who is European or has lived in Europe for at least 12 months. Due to infection control measures taken because of the COVID-19 pandemic, the 2020 lecture was held as a Zoom webinar.

Milner Award winners
Year	Image	Recipient	Nationality	Rationale	Ref
2012	A man holding wooden bars	Gordon Plotkin	British	"for his fundamental research into programming semantics with lasting impact on both the principles and design of programming languages"	
2013	A man with crossed arms smiling	Serge Abiteboul	French	"for his world leading database research with significant scientific and industrial impact"	
2014	–	Bernhard Schölkopf	German	"for being a pioneer in machine learning whose work defined the field of 'kernel machines' which are widely used in all areas of science and industry"	
2015	A man smiling and talking into a microphone	Thomas Henzinger	Austrian	"for his fundamental advances in the theory and practice of formal verification and synthesis of reactive, real-time, and hybrid computer systems"	
2016	A man talking and gesturing while holding a projector remote	Xavier Leroy	French	"for his exceptional achievements in computer programming which includes the design and implementation of the OCaml programming language"	
2017	–	Andrew Zisserman	British	"for his work on computational theory and commercial systems for geometrical images and as a pioneer in machine learning for vision"	
2018	A woman with a bob haircut talking into a microphone	Marta Kwiatkowska	Polish	"for her contribution to the theoretical and practical development of stochastic and quantitative model checking"	
2019	A man with a black suit and glasses talking into a microphone	Eugene Myers	American	"for his development of computational techniques that have brought genome sequencing into everyday use, underpinned key biological sequencing tools, and made large scale analysis of biological images practical"	
2020	–	Cordelia Schmid	French	"for her work in computer vision and her fundamental contributions to the representation of images and videos for visual recognition"	
2021	A man with a black suit and glasses smiling	Zoubin Ghahramani	British / Iranian	"for his fundamental contributions to probabilistic machine learning"	
2022	–	Yvonne Rogers	British	"for contributions to Human-Computer Interaction and the design of human-centred technology"	
2023	A man smiling	Stéphane Mallat	French	"for his key advances in the fundamental principles of wavelets, including theory for audio, image and video processing, his entrepreneurship, and for contributing significantly to advancing the understanding of deep neural networks"	
2024	A man smiling	Artur Ekert	British / Polish	"for his pioneering contributions to quantum communication and computation, which transformed the field of quantum information science from a niche academic activity into a vibrant interdisciplinary field of industrial relevance"	
2024	A man smiling	Iryna Gurevych	Ukrainian / German	"for her major contributions to natural language processing (NLP) and artificial intelligence that combine deep understanding of human language and cognitive faculty with the latest paradigms in machine learning"	
2025		Johan Håstad	Swedish	"for the sustained and transformational impact in multiple fields, including circuit complexity, cryptography, parallel computing and approximate optimisation"	
2026	Monika Henzinger	Monika Henzinger	German	"for pioneering research in areas including efficient algorithms, differential privacy, web information retrieval, and systems profiling, and having a long-lasting impact in academia and industry"	

== See also ==
- List of computer science awards
