= Lennart Åqvist =

Swedish logician (1932–2019)

Lennart Åqvist (11 March 1932 – 7 March 2019) was a Swedish logician. He was a founding member of the editorial board of the Journal of Philosophical Logic. Åqvist received his PhD from Uppsala University in 1960 and has subsequently worked at Uppsala as Docent of Practical Philosophy and as a Reader in Practical Philosophy in the College of Law. On 5 June 1992 he received an honorary doctorate from the Faculty of Law at Uppsala University. Åqvist died on 7 March 2019, at the age of 86.

== Published works ==
- Some Logico-Semantical Themes in Karl Olivecrona's Philosophy of Law: A Non-Exegetical Approach. (2008) Theoria 74 (4):271-294.
- An Interpretation of Probability in the Law of Evidence Based on Pro-Et-Contra Argumentation. (2007) Artificial Intelligence and Law 15 (4).
- Some Remarks on Performatives in the Law. (2003) Artificial Intelligence and Law 11 (2-3).
- Old Foundations for the Logic of Agency and Action. (2002) Studia Logica 72 (3).
- The Logic of Historical Necessity as Founded on Two-Dimensional Modal Tense Logic. (1999) Journal of Philosophical Logic 28 (4).
- Discrete Tense Logic with Infinitary Inference Rules and Systematic Frame Constants: A Hilbert-Style Axiomatization. (1996) Journal of Philosophical Logic 25 (1).
- On the Logic of Causally Necessary and Sufficient Conditions: Towards a Theory of Motive-Explanations of Human Actions. (1989) Erkenntnis 31 (1).
- Some Results on Dyadic Deontic Logic and the Logic of Preference. (1986) Synthese 66 (1).
- On the Logical Syntax or Linguistic Deep Structure of Certain Crime Descriptions: Prolegomena to the Doctrine of Criminal Intent. (1985) Synthese 65
- A Conjectured Axiomatization of Two-Dimensional Reichenbachian Tense Logic. (1979). Journal of Philosophical Logic 8 (1).
- Modal Logic with Subjunctive Conditionals and Dispositional Predicates. (1973) Journal of Philosophical Logic 2 (1).
- Improved Formulations of Act-Utilitarianism. (1969) Noûs 3 (3):299-323.
- Chisholm-Sosa Logics of Intrinsic Betterness and Value. (1968) Noûs 2 (3):253-270.
- Good Samaritans, Contrary-to-Duty Imperatives, and Epistemic Obligations. (1967) Noûs 1 (4):361-379.
- Semantic and Pragmatic Characterizability of Linguistic Usage. (1967) Synthese 17 (1).
- Results Concerning Some Modal Systems That Contain S. (1964) Journal of Symbolic Logic 29 (2).
- A Solution to Moore's Paradox. (1964) Philosophical Studies 15 (1-2).
- Interpretations of Deontic Logic. (1964) Mind 73 (290):246-253.
- Results Concerning Some Modal Systems That Contain S. (1964) Journal of Symbolic Logic 29 (2):79-87.
- A Note on Commitment. (1963) Philosophical Studies 14 (1-2).
- Semantic Concepts of Expression. (1962) Philosophy and Phenomenological Research 23 (1):89-100.
