= Monika Henzinger =

German computer scientist

Monika Henzinger Dr. h.c.
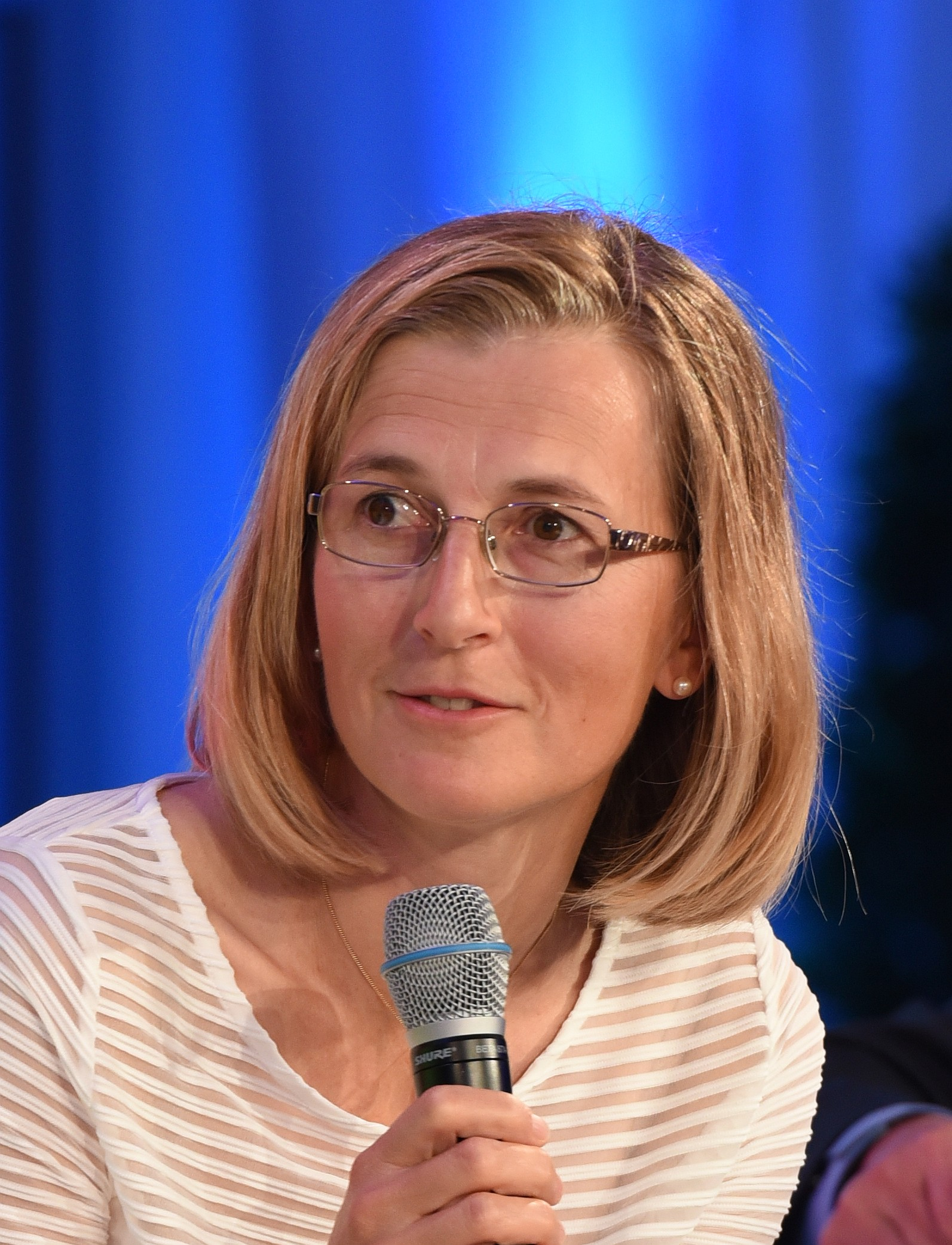
- Monika Henzinger (2018)
- Born: Monika Rauch; April 17, 1966; Weiden in der Oberpfalz
- Education: University of Erlangen–Nuremberg, Saarland University, Princeton University
- Awards: Milner Award, Wittgenstein Award
- Scientific career
- Fields: Computer science
- Workplaces: Google, École Polytechnique Fédérale de Lausanne, University of Vienna, Institute of Science and Technology Austria
- Thesis: Fully Dynamic Graph Algorithms and Their Data Structures (1993)
- Doctoral advisor: Robert Tarjan
- Doctoral students: Paul Dütting, Gramoz Goranci

Monika Henzinger (born as Monika Rauch, 17 April 1966 in Weiden in der Oberpfalz) is a German computer scientist, and is a former director of research at Google. She is currently a professor at the Institute of Science and Technology Austria. Her expertise is mainly on algorithms with a focus on data structures, algorithmic game theory, information retrieval, search algorithms and Web data mining. She is married to Thomas Henzinger and has three children.

== Career ==
She completed her PhD in 1993 from Princeton University under the supervision of Robert Tarjan. She then became an assistant professor of computer science at Cornell University, a research staff at Digital Equipment Corporation, an associate professor at the Saarland University, a director of research at Google, a full professor of computer science at École Polytechnique Fédérale de Lausanne and a full professor of computer science at the University of Vienna, Austria. Since 2023 she is a professor at the Institute of Science and Technology Austria (ISTA).

== Awards ==
- 1995: NSF Career Award
- 1997: Best Paper, ACM SOSP Conference
- 2001: Top 25 Women on the Web Award
- 2004: European Young Investigator award
- 2009: Olga Taussky Pauli Fellowship
- 2010: Member of the "Junge Kurie" of the Austrian Academy of Sciences
- 2013: Honorary Doctorate of the Technical University of Dortmund, Germany
- 2013: ERC Advanced Grant from the European Research Council
- 2013: Elected to Academia Europaea
- 2014: One of ten inaugural fellows of the European Association for Theoretical Computer Science
- 2014: Elected to German Academy of Sciences Leopoldina
- 2017: Fellow of the Association for Computing Machinery
- 2021: Wittgenstein Award
- 2027: Milner Award

== Selected publications ==
- Henzinger, Monika; King, Valerie (1995), "Fully Dynamic Biconnectivity and Transitive Closure", 36th Annual Symposium on Foundations of Computer Science (FOCS'95) (PDF), pp. 664–672, doi:10.1109/SFCS.1995.492668, ISBN 978-0-8186-7183-8, S2CID 206559885.
- Bharat, Krishna; Henzinger, Monika R. (1998), "Improved Algorithms for Topic Distillation in a Hyperlinked Environment", Proceedings of the 21st Annual International ACM SIGIR Conference on Research and Development in Information Retrieval (SIGIR '98), New York, NY, USA: ACM, pp. 104–111, doi:10.1145/290941.290972, ISBN 978-1-58113-015-7, S2CID 1146457.
- Silverstein, Craig; Henzinger, Monika; Marais, Hannes; Moricz, Michael (1999), "Analysis of a Very Large Web Search Engine Query Log", ACM SIGIR Forum (PDF), vol. 33, pp. 6–12, doi:10.1145/331403.331405, S2CID 10184913.
