= Institute of Science and Technology Austria =

Research institute

Coordinates: 48°18′38″N 16°15′40″E

- Type: Public
- Established: 2009; 17 years ago
- President: Martin Hetzer
- Faculty: 81 professors (2024)
- Doctoral students: 365 (2024)
- Location: Klosterneuburg, Lower Austria, Austria
- Website: www.ista.ac.at

The Institute of Science and Technology Austria (ISTA) is an international research institute in natural and formal sciences, located in Maria Gugging, Klosterneuburg, 20 km northwest of the Austrian capital of Vienna. It was established and inaugurated by the provincial government of Lower Austria and the federal government of Austria in 2009.

ISTA was established on the model of the Israeli Weizmann Institute of Science by its former president Israeli physicist Haim Harari. Like in the Weizmann Institute, scientists are encouraged to pursue their own goals and ideas not restricted by government or economic interest and all research themes are interdisciplinary.

As of 2024, ISTA consists of 84 research groups covering the fields of chemistry, biochemistry, physics, astronomy, earth science, mathematics, computer science, data science, biology, neuroscience and evolution & ecology. It is expected to grow to about 90 research groups by 2026, and 150 groups by 2036 following commitments from the federal state and Lower Austria. Its graduate school offers an interdisciplinary doctoral program in the life, formal and physical sciences. As of 2024, 365 students were enrolled.

== History ==
The idea of creating a scientific flagship organization for research and postgraduate studies at the highest level was proposed by Austrian physicist and Nobel laureate in physics of 2022 Anton Zeilinger in 2002 at the annual technology forum in Alpbach. After several studies about the feasibility of creating such an institute, a working group was formed in the Austrian federal ministry of education and science and the four provinces of Lower Austria, Upper Austria, Styria and Vienna put in bids to host the new institute. In 2005, the council of ministers decided to build the institute in Klosterneuburg, Lower Austria.

In 2006, an international group of three scientists including Haim Harari, Olaf Kuebler and Hubert Markl were invited by the Federation of Austrian Industries to advise the establishment of the institute and create a road map for it. They published a report in June 2006 that became the foundation of ISTA.

The federal law on the Institute of Science and Technology Austria was passed in May 2006 and an agreement between the government of Lower Austria and the Federal government of Austria was reached in July.

Positions for the first president, professors and tenure track professors were advertised in 2007. Nick Barton was the first faculty to join. On December 4, 2008, computer scientist Thomas Henzinger was appointed as the first president of ISTA effective September 1, 2009. His contract was extended in 2013, 2016, and 2020, but Henzinger then said that we would not serve the full term. At the beginning of 2023, Martin Hetzer became president of ISTA while Thomas Henzinger stayed at ISTA as a professor.

In 2022, the abbreviation of the institute's name was changed from "IST Austria" to "ISTA".

=== First Evaluation ===
As per the regulations, the institute is mandated to undergo an international and independent evaluation every four years. In January 2011, the Scientific Board coordinated the inaugural independent evaluation of the institute. The review panel comprised six scientists with substantial experience in both scientific research and science management. The reviewers included two Nobel laureates and former or current presidents of distinguished research institutions. The panel broadly represented the natural and engineering sciences beyond the research areas that were present at ISTA at the time.

In March 2011, the evaluation committee came to the result that ISTA is on its way to becoming a leading research institution with an international reputation and that the institute is about to set new benchmarks for both research and training that will not only be important on the national level but also within Europe generally and even more widely. The committee pointed out that the trajectory of development of all the elements of ISTA is towards making an organization of clear excellence that will be recognized throughout the world, but continued governmental support is a necessary condition.

=== Second Evaluation ===
In 2015, a second evaluation was carried out by an international review panel chaired by the Nobel laureate Roger Kornberg. The panel consisted of six distinguished scientists including three Nobel laureates and a Turing awardee. The report was very positive, reading "The next years will prove crucial if the ISTA is to achieve the goal of international distinction. The ISTA has made an excellent start, accomplishing the difficult task of starting from scratch and laying a foundation for future development, but the next step, rising to the top, will be even more difficult."

=== Third Evaluation ===
The institute’s third evaluation in 2019 was carried out by a review panel chaired by Nobel laureate Serge Haroche. The panel was composed of international scientists, among them Nobel laureate Ada Yonath. This evaluation focused on the scientific achievements and portfolio as well as the general development of the institute, the graduate school, the support structures, efforts in technology transfer and science education, and plans for its future expansion. The evaluation concluded that ISTA has been following a positive trajectory in its first ten years of existence that meets the goals set by the Austrian government and the state of Lower Austria. It argues for continued national and state-level commitment to fund the institute and continue its academic freedom.

== Campus ==
The ISTA campus in Maria Gugging, Klosterneuburg, consists of ten main buildings in a green space area of 179,000m². The historical Central Building hosts a lecture hall, seminar rooms, the guest house, and recreational facilities. A bridge connects it to the Bertalanffy Foundation Building, named after pharmaceutical producer Peter Bertalanffy, which hosts research groups. Similarly, the Lab Building East and the Lab Building West host research groups. Together with the building of the Preclinical Facility and two administrative buildings, they encircle the central pond.

In 2021, the Sunstone Building for chemical research was opened. In 2023, the Moonstone Building was opened hosting the first astrophysics research groups at ISTA as well as space for the VISTA Science Experience Lab.

Next to the ISTA campus, the two buildings of the xista science park, previously named “IST Park”, host ISTA’s technology transfer company xista and several research-related companies. In 2022, the Michael-Gröller-bridge connecting the campus and the xista science park was opened. The bridge was named after industrialist Michael Gröller who donated one million euro to ISTA.

== Graduate school ==
The institute's graduate school offers an interdisciplinary PhD program with six research tracks: biology, computer science, mathematics, neuroscience, physics, and data science and scientific computing. During the first year, students conduct three rotation projects in different research groups, before affiliating permanently with a research group and taking a qualifying exam. In the subsequent three to four years, students pursue research projects towards a PhD thesis.

Since the academic year 2021-22, ISTA offers students the option to earn an additional Master's degree during the PhD program requiring additional curricular activities.

== Reputation ==
ISTA is ranked at place 1112 out of 2000 by the Center of World University Rankings (CWUR), at world rank 1401 by uniRank, and at place 2924 out of 14,131 worldwide by EduRank. When normalized by size, its research output was ranked third in the world by Nature Index in 2019. In 2022, Nature Index ranked ISTA at place 500 out of 500.

== Technology Transfer ==
As recommended in the initial report on the foundation of ISTA, the institute provides infrastructure and services to support the creation and licensing of applied technologies as well as the founding of spin-off companies based on its researchers’ work. Since 2023, these efforts are collected under the xista brand with several subdivisions: xista innovation supports the commercialization of technologies based on research at ISTA; xista science park, formerly “IST Park”, is a space for offices and laboratories of companies next to the ISTA campus; and xista science ventures is a seed fund to support research spin-off companies. In its first iteration in 2021, the fund—then named “IST cube”—raised €45 million investing them in 14 companies.

== Funding ==
The long-term financial health of ISTA relies on four different sources of funding: public funding, national and international research grants, technology licensing, and donations. From 2017 to 2026, ISTA will receive up to €1.4 billion in public funding. Of those €1.4 billion, up to €990 million come from the federal government of Austria depending on the institute's ability to procure third-party funds. The state of Lower Austria provides the remaining €368 million in funding.

In 2021, ISTA signed the 15a-agreement with the federal government of Austria and the state of Lower Austria securing its funding until 2036. The federal government will fund €2.46 billion, a third of which is dependent on the institute's ability to procure third-party funds. The state of Lower Austria will provide €820 million.

In 2022, ISTA started a fundraising campaign to become more financially independent. The anchor donor Magdalena Walz, a Viennese entrepreneur, bequeathed €25 million to ISTA’s endowment after her death in 2021.

As of 2023, 58 ERC grants by the European Research Council have been awarded to ISTA faculty members.

== Organization ==
The governance and management structures of ISTA guarantee the freedom from political and commercial influences. ISTA is headed by the President, who is appointed by the board of trustees. More than half of the board of trustees is made up of international scientists, the remainder comprises members appointed by the federal government and the government of Lower Austria. The President is further advised by the Scientific Board.

The first president of ISTA was Thomas Henzinger, a computer scientist and former professor of the University of California at Berkeley and the EPFL in Lausanne, Switzerland. He was succeeded by Martin Hetzer in 2023. Hetzer was previously professor as well as Senior Vice President and Chief Science Officer at the Salk Institute in La Jolla, California.

The president is supported by Vice President Gaia Novarino, who oversees the operation of the scientific service units. The administration of ISTA is being led by Managing Director Georg Schneider.

=== BRIDGE Network ===
ISTA is part of the BRIDGE Network. Its name is an acronym for “Basic Research Institutions Delivering Graduate Education”. The network is an informal networking platform for international research institutions that have close ties to ISTA.

Apart from ISTA, the BRIDGE Network’s members are:

- Francis Crick Institute, United Kingdom
- Okinawa Institute of Science and Technology, Japan
- Rockefeller University, United States
- Weizmann Institute of Science, Israel

== Notable faculty ==
As of 2024, the faculty consists of 81 professors and assistant professors, including:

- Nick Barton, evolutionary and mathematical biology
- Timothy Browning, number theory
- Krishnendu Chatterjee, theoretical computer science
- Jozsef Csicsvari, systems neuroscience
- Herbert Edelsbrunner, algorithms, geometry and topology
- Tamás Hausel, geometry, pure mathematics
- Carl-Philipp Heisenberg, developmental biology
- Thomas Henzinger, software systems theory
- Monika Henzinger, computer science, algorithms
- Maria Ibáñez, material science
- Vadim Kaloshin, mathematics, dynamical systems
- Leonid Sazanov, molecular biology, bioenergetics
- Robert Seiringer, quantum statistical mechanics, mathematical physics
- Gašper Tkačik, biophysics and neuroscience
- Tim Vogels, theoretical neuroscience
