= Ilya Nemenman =

Belarusian theoretical physicist

Ilya Mark Nemenman (born January 8, 1975, in Minsk, Belarus) is a theoretical physicist at Emory University, where he is a Winship Distinguished Research Professor of Physics and Biology. He is known for his studies of information processing in biological systems and for developing coarse-grained models of these systems. He is a Fellow of the American Physical Society for "his contributions to theoretical biological physics, especially information processing in a variety of living systems, and for the development of coarse-grained modeling methods of such systems". He is a Simons Investigator and James S. McDonnell Foundation Complex Systems Scholar. He also served in the Chair Line of the Division of Biological Physics of the American Physical Society, from 2013 to 2018. Nemenman also was a founder of the q-bio conference, and is a general member of the Aspen Center for Physics.

== Life ==
Ilya Nemenman is the son of Mark Nemenman, a Soviet computer scientist. He studied physics at the Belarusian State University before moving to the US to complete his BS in physics and math at Santa Clara University. He studied for his master's degree in physics at San Francisco State University. He studied for his PhD under Bill Bialek at Princeton University, and graduated in 2000. He then completed postdoctoral research at the University of California, Santa Barbara and Columbia University before starting work at Los Alamos National Laboratory. Finally, in 2009, he moved to join the faculty at Emory University. He has 3 children.
