= Mark Nemenman =

Soviet computer scientist (1936–2022)

Mark Nemenman (Russian: Марк Ефимович Неменман; 6 November 1936 – 20 September 2022) was a Soviet computer scientist, notable as a pioneer in systems programming and programming language research.

== Biography ==
Mark Nemenman was born in Minsk to a Jewish family of a typographical worker (father) and an accountant (mother) as the youngest child with two sisters. With the onset of the Nazi German invasion the family fled eastwards, but the grandparents stayed and perished in Minsk Ghetto. After the war, the family returned to Minsk, and Mark Nemenman lived there until he emigrated to the United States.

In 1953 he graduated from the secondary school with a silver medal, which allowed him to skip the entrance exams and enroll into the Belarusian State University in mathematics despite antisemitism in the Soviet Union at the time. He graduated from the university in 1958. His graduation diploma work was in programming, namely a code for calculation of the determinant of degree N. It was only on paper, because there was no computers in Minsk at the time.

In 1974 he was married and the couple had two sons, one of whom is theoretical physicist Ilya Nemenman.

== Work ==
In 1961 Nemenman joined the design bureau of the Ordzhonikidze computer plant (Минский завод ЭВМ имени Г. К. Орджоникидзе). Later the bureau was separated into an R&D institute which has become NII EVM.

Nemenman was one of the main developers of the AKI autocode (Engineer autocode; Russian: АКИ - АвтоКод ИНЖЕНЕР) in 1964.

He led the development of system software for Minsk-32, the most popular of Minsk family of computers.

He was awarded the Lenin Komsomol Prize in 1970 and received his candidate of sciences degree (Ph.D.) in 1975, (Note: Ph.D. thesis: "Метод разработки систем программного обеспечения и его реализация для ЭВМ "Минск-32" [A method for developing software systems and its implementation for the Minsk-32 computer]) with his scientific advisor being Andrey Yershov.. He has held a docentship at the Belarusian State University since 1984.

Nemenman authored more than 70 papers and several books.

== Books ==
- М.Е. Неменман, В.И. Цегельский. И.М. Матюшевская. Автокод для решения инженерных задач на машине "Минск-2", Минск, Изд-во ИНТИП, 1965. [Nemenman, Tsagelsky, Matyushevskaya Autocode for engineering problems solving on Minsk 2 Minsk, 1965]
- Nemenman Programming in AKI Minsk, 1972
- Kushnerev, Nemenman, Tsagelsky Programming for Computer Minsk-32 Moscow, 1973
- Belokurskaya, Kushnerev, Nemenman Minsk 32 Dispatcher Moscow, 1973
- Lopato, Nemenman, Pykhtin, Tikmenov Personal-professional Computers Moscow, 1988
- Belokurskaya, Emelyanchik, Nemenman Personal Computers ES. Abacus Package Moscow, 1995
