= Yazd University =

University in Yazd, Iran

Coordinates: 31.8368°N 54.3491°E

- دانشگاه يزد
- Type: State
- Established: 1989
- President: Dr. Abbas Kalantari Khalilabad
- Faculty: 400
- Students: 13500
- Location: Yazd, Yazd province, Iran
- Campus: Urban, Rural
- Website: www.yazd.ac.ir (engl.)

Yazd University (YU, Persian: دانشگاه یزد, Daneshgah-e Yazd) is a public research university in Yazd, Iran. It is a major state-funded research center in central Iran and the academic center of Yazd province and was the first comprehensive institute of higher education established after the 1979 Islamic revolution. It is also the principal heir to the former University College Yazd (Persian: دانشسرای عالی یزد). Yazd University is considered to be among the top 10 comprehensive universities in Iran and it is among 200 best world's young universities.

The university was founded in 1989 by a merger of several older institutions and grew rapidly over the years. Its main campus is located in Safaeeyeh. There are four other campuses and two autonomous schools, all located within or in the vicinity of the city of Yazd.

Yazd University offers BSc, MSc and PhD degrees in more than 40 fields through its 29 departments and is home to more than 14,000 students.

== Faculties and schools ==
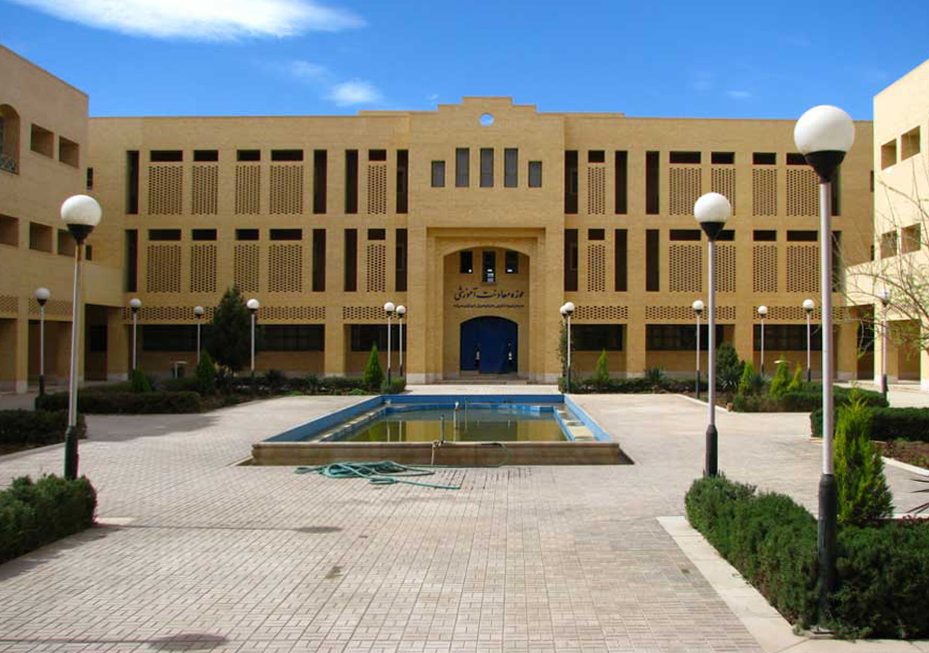
A courtyard on the campus

The university currently has three faculties and two schools as follows:

Faculty of Engineering: This faculty started its activities in 1988 and includes the following departments:

1. Department of Electrical Engineering: In the early 1990s, the Department of Electrical Engineering and Computer Engineering (ECE) was established within the Faculty of Engineering of YU. These two departments were then joined in 2008 into the Department of Electrical and Computer Engineering.
2. Department of Mining & Metallurgical Engineering: The Department of Mining and Metallurgical Engineering was established in 1991. The most important research activities of this department have been holding five conferences, publishing a scientific and research journal, and running a mining engineering research center.
3. Department of Civil Engineering
4. Department of Mechanical Engineering (Fluid mechanics and Robotics are its best classifications)
5. Department of Computer Engineering
6. Department of Industrial Engineering
7. Department of Textile Engineering
8. Department of Chemical & Polymer Engineering

Faculty of Humanities & Social Sciences: This faculty started its activities in 1977 and includes the following departments:

1. Department of Economics, Management & Accounting: The Department of Economy, Management and Accounting of Yazd University has begun its activities since 1990 initially with Industrial Management field.
2. Department of Social Sciences: The history of this department goes back to 1995 when the Department of Social Science was established. It became an independent department ten years later in 2005.
3. Department of Languages and Literature: The history of the Languages and Literature Department dates back to 1976 when the Persian Literature Department was founded in Teacher Training University. Later on, it was merged with Yazd University in 1992. The Programs of English Language and Literature and Arabic Language and Literature were later added to the department in 1994 and 1997 respectively.
4. Department of Psychology and Educational Sciences
5. Department of Theology
6. Department of Geography
7. Department of Law & Political Sciences

Faculty of Science: This faculty includes the following departments

1. Department of Physics: The Department of Physics was established in 1982. Recently there are 5 programs; Atomic and Molecular Physics, Solid State Physics, Nuclear Physics, Elementary Particle Physics, Meteorology Physics.
2. Department of Mathematical Sciences: The Department of Mathematical Sciences was founded in 1977 under the name of Mathematics and initially offered only B.Sc. in mathematics, M.Sc. and Ph.D. in pure and applied mathematics were added in 1994 and 2004 respectively. Moreover, the M.Sc. in financial mathematics as a new interdisciplinary branch of applied mathematics began in 2011. Computer science was founded in the Department of Mathematics of Yazd University in 2001, and since then has accepted students for the Bachelor of Science degree. From 2009, the master's degree and in 2012 the Ph.D. degree in computer science started.
3. Department of Chemistry
4. Department of Geology
5. Department of Biology

School of Natural Resources & Desert Studies: This school was established in 1992. The school includes the following departments:

1. Department of Environmental Sciences
2. Department of Arid Land and Desert Management
3. Department of Watershed & Rangeland Management

School of Art and Architecture: The school includes the following departments:

1. Department of Architecture
2. Department of Painting
3. Department of Urban Planning

== See also ==
- Higher education in Iran
