= Thomas Henzinger =

Austrian computer scientist

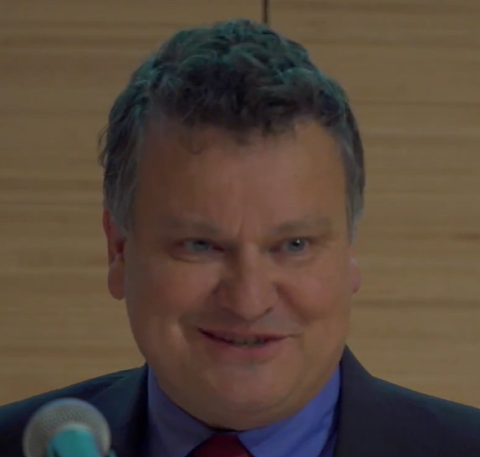
- Henzinger in 2016
- Born: 1962 (age 63–64); Austria
- Education: Johannes Kepler University Linz; Stanford University
- Awards: NAS Member (2020); IEEE Fellow; Member, Academy of Sciences Leopoldina; Member, Austrian Academy of Sciences; Member, Academia Europaea
- Scientific career
- Fields: Computer science
- Workplaces: Institute of Science and Technology, Austria

Thomas Henzinger (born 1962) is an Austrian computer scientist, researcher, and former president of the Institute of Science and Technology, Austria.

== Early life and education ==
Henzinger was born in Austria. He received his bachelor's degree in computer science from Johannes Kepler University Linz, and his PhD from Stanford University in 1991, advised by Zohar Manna. He is married to Monika Henzinger and has three children.

== Career ==
Henzinger was successively Assistant Professor of Computer Science at Cornell University (1992–95) and Assistant Professor (1996–97), Associate Professor (1997–98), Professor (1998–2004) and Adjunct Professor (till 2011) of Electrical Engineering and Computer Sciences at the University of California, Berkeley. He was also director of the Max Planck Institute of Computer Science in Saarbrücken, Germany in 1999 and Professor of Computer and Communication Sciences at EPFL (the Swiss Federal Institute of Technology in Lausanne), Switzerland from 2004 to 2009. Until 2022, he was president of the Institute of Science and Technology Austria (ISTA).

His research is concerned with modern systems theory, particularly on the models, algorithms, and tools for the design and verification of reliable software, hardware, and embedded systems. His HyTech tool was the first model checker for mixed discrete-continuous systems.

For more on his influential work and academic contributions, his Google Scholar profile provides a comprehensive list of his publications, and his academic lineage can be explored on the Mathematics Genealogy Project page.

== Other activities ==
- European Research Council (ERC), Member of the Scientific Council (since 2023)

== Recognition ==
Henzinger is a member of the US National Academy of Sciences, the American Academy of Arts and Sciences, Academia Europaea, the German Academy of Sciences (Leopoldina), and the Austrian Academy of Sciences. He received a Doctor honoris causa from Fourier University in Grenoble and from Masaryk University in Brno. He is also a Fellow of the AAAS, the ACM, and the IEEE. He has received the 2015 Robin Milner Award of the Royal Society, the EATCS Award of the European Association for Theoretical Computer Science, and the Wittgenstein Award of the Austrian Science Fund. He was recognized as an ISI Highly Cited Researcher in 2001 and is ranked as the most-cited researcher in Austria according to h-index data.
